= History of life =

The history of life on Earth traces the processes by which living and extinct organisms evolved, from the earliest emergence of life to the present day. Earth formed about 4.54 ± 0.05 billion years ago (abbreviated as Ga, for gigaannum) and evidence suggests that life emerged prior to 3.7 Ga. The similarities among all known present-day species indicate that they have diverged through the process of evolution from a common ancestor.

The earliest clear evidence of life comes from biogenic carbon signatures and stromatolite fossils discovered in 3.7 billion-year-old metasedimentary rocks from western Greenland. In 2015, possible "remains of biotic life" were found in 4.1 billion-year-old rocks in Western Australia. There is further evidence of possibly the oldest forms of life in the form of fossilized microorganisms in hydrothermal vent precipitates from the Nuvvuagittuq Belt, that may have lived as early as 4.28 billion years ago, not long after the oceans formed 4.4 billion years ago, and after the Earth formed 4.54 ± 0.05 billion years ago. These earliest fossils, however, may have originated from non-biological processes.

Microbial mats of coexisting bacteria and archaea were the dominant form of life in the early Archean eon, and many of the major steps in early evolution are thought to have taken place in this environment. The evolution of photosynthesis by cyanobacteria, around 3.5 Ga, eventually led to a buildup of its waste product, oxygen, in the oceans. After free oxygen saturated all available reductant substances on the Earth's surface, it built up in the atmosphere, leading to the Great Oxygenation Event around 2.4 Ga. The earliest evidence of eukaryotes (complex cells with organelles) dates from 1.85 Ga, likely due to symbiogenesis between anaerobic archaea and aerobic proteobacteria in co-adaptation against the new oxidative stress. While eukaryotes may have been present earlier, their diversification accelerated when aerobic cellular respiration by the endosymbiont mitochondria provided a more abundant source of biological energy. Around 1.6 Ga, some eukaryotes gained the ability to photosynthesize via endosymbiosis with cyanobacteria, and gave rise to various algae that eventually overtook cyanobacteria as the dominant primary producers.

At around 1.7 Ga, multicellular organisms began to appear, with differentiated cells performing specialized functions. While early organisms reproduced asexually, the primary method of reproduction for the vast majority of macroscopic organisms, including almost all eukaryotes (which include animals and plants), is sexual reproduction, the fusion of male and female reproductive cells (gametes) to create a zygote. The origin and evolution of sexual reproduction remain a puzzle for biologists, though it is thought to have evolved from a single-celled eukaryotic ancestor.

Microorganisms had already formed terrestrial ecosystems by at least 2.7 Ga. By about 1 billion years ago, eukaryotes, including multicellular forms, inhabited freshwater environments. Ediacara biota appeared during the Ediacaran period, and bilaterians—animals with bilateral symmetry—were present by 555 Ma (million years ago). Animal life diversified during the Cambrian explosion, with early vertebrates present by about 525 Ma.

Land plants evolved from green algae, with fossil evidence dating to the Ordovician period, about 470 million years ago. Microorganisms are thought to have paved the way for their colonization of land. The subsequent spread of plants may have contributed to the Late Devonian extinction event: early trees such as Archaeopteris drew down atmospheric CO_{2}, contributing to global cooling and lower sea levels, while their roots increased rock weathering and nutrient runoff, potentially triggering algal blooms and anoxic events.

During the Permian period, synapsids, including the ancestors of mammals, dominated the land. The Permian–Triassic extinction event, 252 Ma, killed most complex species of its time. During the recovery from this catastrophe, archosaurs became the most abundant land vertebrates; one archosaur group, the dinosaurs, dominated the Jurassic and Cretaceous periods. After the Cretaceous–Paleogene extinction event 66 Ma killed off the non-avian dinosaurs, mammals increased rapidly in size and diversity. Such mass extinctions may have accelerated evolution by providing opportunities for new groups of organisms to diversify.

Only a very small percentage of species have been identified: one estimate claims that Earth may have 1 trillion species, because "identifying every microbial species on Earth presents a huge challenge." Only 1.75–1.8 million species have been named and 1.8 million documented in a central database. The currently living species represent less than one percent of all species that have ever lived on Earth.

== Earliest history of Earth ==
Life timeline
← / Earth formed; ← / Earliest water; ← / LUCA; ← / Earliest fossils; ← / Great Oxygenation Event; ← / Sexual reproduction; ← / Earliest fungi; ← / Neoproterozoic oxygenation event; ← / Ediacaran biota; ← / Cambrian explosion; ← / Earliest tetrapods; ← / Earliest hominoid
(million years ago)

History of Earth and its life
← / Earth and Solar System formed; ← / Cool surface, oceans, atmosphere; ← / Late Heavy Bombardment; ← / Earliest evidence of life (-4100); ← / Oxygenation of atmosphere; ← / Earliest indisputable multicellular organism; ← / Cambrian explosion; ← / Earliest land invertebrates and plants; ← / Earliest land vertebrates; ← / Earliest known dinosaur; ← / Extinction of non-avian dinosaurs
Scale: Ma (Millions of years)

The oldest meteorite fragments found on Earth are about 4.54 billion years old; this, coupled primarily with the dating of ancient lead deposits, has put the estimated age of Earth at around that time. The Moon has the same composition as Earth's crust but does not contain an iron-rich core like the Earth's. Many scientists think that about 60–110 million years (period of late stage accretion) after the formation of the Solar System, the proto-Earth collided with Theia, a co-orbital, Mars-sized protoplanet originating from the Inner Solar System. This collision ejected massive amounts of proto-Earth silicate mantle material into orbit that accreted to form the Moon. Another hypothesis is that the Earth and Moon started to coalesce at the same time but the Earth, having a much stronger gravity than the early Moon, attracted almost all the iron particles in the area.

Until 2001, the oldest rocks found on Earth were about 3.8 billion years old, leading scientists to estimate that the Earth's surface had been molten until then. Accordingly, they named this part of Earth's history the Hadean. However, analysis of zircons formed 4.4 Ga indicates that Earth's crust solidified about 100 million years after the planet's formation and that the planet quickly acquired oceans and an atmosphere, which may have been capable of supporting life.

Evidence from the Moon indicates that, from 4 to 3.8 Ga, it suffered a Late Heavy Bombardment by debris that was left over from the formation of the Solar System, and the Earth should have experienced an even heavier bombardment due to its stronger gravity. While there is no direct evidence of conditions on Earth 4 to 3.8 Ga, there is no reason to think that the Earth was not also affected by this late heavy bombardment. This event may well have stripped away any previous atmosphere and oceans; in this case gases and water from comet impacts may have contributed to their replacement, although outgassing from volcanoes on Earth would have supplied at least half. However, if subsurface microbial life had evolved by this point, it would have survived the bombardment.

== Earliest evidence for life on Earth ==
The earliest identified organisms were minute and relatively featureless, and their fossils looked like small rods that are very difficult to tell apart from structures that arise through abiotic physical processes. The oldest undisputed evidence of life on Earth, interpreted as fossilized bacteria, dates to 3 Ga. Other finds in rocks dated to about 3.5 Ga have been interpreted as bacteria, with geochemical evidence also seeming to show the presence of life 3.8 Ga. However, these analyses were closely scrutinized, and non-biological processes were found which could produce all of the "signatures of life" that had been reported. While this does not prove that the structures found had a non-biological origin, they cannot be taken as clear evidence for the presence of life. Geochemical signatures from rocks deposited 3.4 Ga have been interpreted as evidence for life.

Evidence for fossilized microorganisms considered to be 3.77 billion to 4.28 billion years old was found in the Nuvvuagittuq Greenstone Belt in Quebec, Canada, although the evidence is disputed as inconclusive.

== Origins of life on Earth ==
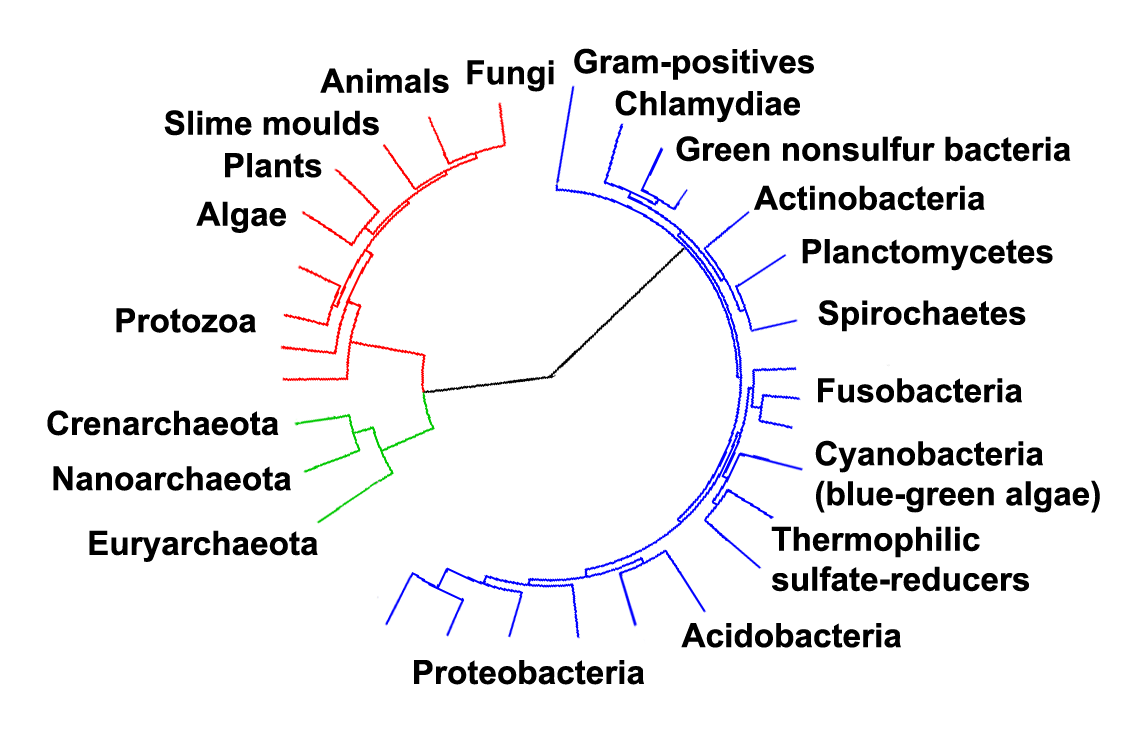
Evolutionary tree showing the divergence of modern species from their common ancestor in the center. The three domains are colored, with bacteria blue, archaea green, and eukaryotes red.

Most biologists reason that all living organisms on Earth must share a single last universal ancestor, because it would be virtually impossible that two or more separate lineages could have independently developed the many complex biochemical mechanisms common to all living organisms.

According to a different scenario a single last universal ancestor, e.g. a "first cell" or a first individual precursor cell has never existed. Instead, the early biochemical evolution of life led to diversification through the development of a multiphenotypic population of pre-cells from which the precursor cells (protocells) of the three domains of life emerged. Thus, the formation of cells was a successive process. See § Metabolism first: Pre–cells (successive cellularization), below.

=== Independent emergence on Earth ===
Life on Earth is based on carbon and water. Carbon provides stable frameworks for complex chemicals and can be easily extracted from the environment, especially from carbon dioxide. There is no other chemical element whose properties are similar enough to carbon's to be called an analogue. Silicon, the element directly below carbon on the periodic table, does not form very many complex stable molecules. Moreover, most of its compounds are water-insoluble and silicon dioxide is a hard and abrasive solid, in contrast to carbon dioxide at temperatures associated with living things. As a result, it would be more difficult for organisms to extract. The elements boron and phosphorus have more complex chemistries but suffer from other limitations relative to carbon. Water is an excellent solvent and has two other useful properties: the fact that ice floats enables aquatic organisms to survive beneath it in winter; and its molecules have electrically negative and positive ends, which enables it to form a wider range of compounds than other solvents can. Other good solvents, such as ammonia, are liquid only at such low temperatures that chemical reactions may be too slow to sustain life, and lack water's other advantages. Organisms based on alternative biochemistry may, however, be possible on other planets.

Research on how life might have emerged from non-living chemicals focuses on three possible starting points: self-replication, an organism's ability to produce offspring that are very similar to itself; metabolism, its ability to feed and repair itself; and external cell membranes, which allow food to enter and waste products to leave, but exclude unwanted substances. Research on the origin of life still has a long way to go, since theoretical and empirical approaches are only beginning to make contact with each other.

==== Replication first: RNA world ====
Even the simplest members of the three modern domains of life use DNA to record their "recipes" and a complex array of RNA and protein molecules to "read" these instructions and use them for growth, maintenance and self-replication. The discovery that some RNA molecules can catalyze both their own replication and the construction of proteins led to the hypothesis of earlier life-forms based entirely on RNA. These ribozymes could have formed an RNA world in which there were individuals but no species, as mutations and horizontal gene transfers would have meant that offspring were likely to have different genomes from their parents, and evolution occurred at the level of genes rather than organisms. RNA would later have been replaced by DNA, which can build longer, more stable genomes, strengthening heritability and expanding the capabilities of individual organisms. Ribozymes remain as the main components of ribosomes, the "protein factories" in modern cells. Evidence suggests the first RNA molecules formed on Earth prior to 4.17 Ga.

Although short self-replicating RNA molecules have been artificially produced in laboratories, doubts have been raised about whether natural non-biological synthesis of RNA is possible. The earliest "ribozymes" may have been formed of simpler nucleic acids such as PNA, TNA or GNA, which would have been replaced later by RNA.

In 2003, it was proposed that porous metal sulfide precipitates would assist RNA synthesis at about 100 °C (212 °F) and ocean-bottom pressures near hydrothermal vents. Under this hypothesis, lipid membranes would be the last major cell components to appear and, until then, the protocells would be confined to the pores.

==== Membranes first: Lipid world ====
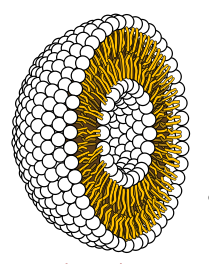
Cross-section through a liposome

It has been suggested that double-walled "bubbles" of lipids like those that form the external membranes of cells may have been an essential first step. Experiments that simulated the conditions of the early Earth have reported the formation of lipids, and these can spontaneously form liposomes, double-walled "bubbles", and then reproduce themselves. Although they are not intrinsically information-carriers as nucleic acids are, they would be subject to natural selection for longevity and reproduction. Nucleic acids such as RNA might then have formed more easily within the liposomes than outside.

==== The clay hypothesis ====
RNA is complex and there are doubts about whether it can be produced non-biologically in the wild. Some clays, notably montmorillonite, have properties that make them plausible accelerators for the emergence of an RNA world: they grow by self-replication of their crystalline pattern; they are subject to an analogue of natural selection, as the clay "species" that grows fastest in a particular environment rapidly becomes dominant; and they can catalyze the formation of RNA molecules. Although this idea has not become the scientific consensus, it still has active supporters.

Research in 2003 reported that montmorillonite could also accelerate the conversion of fatty acids into "bubbles" and that the "bubbles" could encapsulate RNA attached to the clay. These "bubbles" can then grow by absorbing additional lipids and then divide. The formation of the earliest cells may have been aided by similar processes.

A similar hypothesis presents self-replicating iron-rich clays as the progenitors of nucleotides, lipids and amino acids.

==== Metabolism first: Iron–sulfur world ====
A series of experiments starting in 1997 showed that early stages in the formation of proteins from inorganic materials including carbon monoxide and hydrogen sulfide could be achieved by using iron sulfide and nickel sulfide as catalysts. Most of the steps required temperatures of about 100 °C (212 °F) and moderate pressures, although one stage required 250 °C (482 °F) and a pressure equivalent to that found under 7 kilometres (4.3 mi) of rock. Hence it was suggested that self-sustaining synthesis of proteins could have occurred near hydrothermal vents.

==== Metabolism first: Pre–cells (successive cellularization) ====
In this scenario, the biochemical evolution of life led to diversification through the development of a multiphenotypic population of pre-cells, i.e. evolving entities of primordial life with different characteristics and widespread horizontal gene transfer.

Early diversification of life with Kandler's pre-cell theory (Kandler 1998, p. 22)

From this pre-cell population the founder groups A, B, C and then, from them, the precursor cells (here named proto-cells) of the three domains of life arose successively, leading first to the domain Bacteria, then to the domain Archea and finally to the domain Eucarya.

For the development of cells (cellularization), the pre-cells had to be protected from their surroundings by envelopes (i.e. membranes, walls). For instance, the development of rigid cell walls by the invention of peptidoglycan in bacteria (domain Bacteria) may have been a prerequisite for their successful survival, radiation and colonization of virtually all habitats of the geosphere and hydrosphere.

This scenario may explain the quasi-random distribution of evolutionarily important features among the three domains and, at the same time, the existence of the most basic biochemical features (genetic code, set of protein amino acids etc.) in all three domains (unity of life), as well as the close relationship between the Archaea and the Eucarya. A scheme of the pre-cell scenario is shown in the adjacent figure, where important evolutionary improvements are indicated by numbers.

=== Prebiotic environments ===
==== Geothermal springs ====
Wet-dry cycles at geothermal springs are shown to solve the problem of hydrolysis and promote the polymerization and vesicle encapsulation of biopolymers. The temperatures of geothermal springs are suitable for biomolecules. Silica minerals and metal sulfides in these environments have photocatalytic properties to catalyze biomolecules. Solar UV exposure also promotes the synthesis of biomolecules like RNA nucleotides.

An analysis of hydrothermal veins at a 3.5 Gya (giga years ago or 1 billion years) geothermal spring setting were found to have elements required for the origin of life, which are potassium, boron, hydrogen, sulfur, phosphorus, zinc, nitrogen, and oxygen. Mulkidjanian and colleagues find that such environments have identical ionic concentrations to the cytoplasm of modern cells. Fatty acids in acidic or slightly alkaline geothermal springs assemble into vesicles after wet-dry cycles as there is a lower concentration of ionic solutes at geothermal springs since they are freshwater environments, in contrast to seawater which has a higher concentration of ionic solutes.

For organic compounds to be present at geothermal springs, they would have likely been transported by carbonaceous meteors. The molecules that fell from the meteors were then accumulated in geothermal springs. Geothermal springs can accumulate aqueous phosphate in the form of phosphoric acid. Based on lab-run models, these concentrations of phosphate are insufficient to facilitate biosynthesis. As for the evolutionary implications, freshwater heterotrophic cells that depended upon synthesized organic compounds later evolved photosynthesis because of the continuous exposure to sunlight as well as their cell walls with ion pumps to maintain their intracellular metabolism after they entered the oceans.

==== Deep sea hydrothermal vents ====
Catalytic mineral particles and transition metal sulfides at these environments are capable of catalyzing organic compounds. Scientists simulated laboratory conditions that were identical to white smokers and successfully oligomerized RNA, measured to be 4 units long. Long chain fatty acids can be synthesized via Fischer-Tropsch synthesis. Another experiment that replicated conditions also similar white smokers, with long chain fatty acids present resulted in the assembly of vesicles.

Exergonic reactions at hydrothermal vents are suggested to have been a source of free energy that promoted chemical reactions, synthesis of organic molecules, and are inducive to chemical gradients. In small rock pore systems, membranous structures between alkaline seawater and the acidic ocean would be conducive to natural proton gradients. Nucleobase synthesis could occur by following universally conserved biochemical pathways by using metal ions as catalysts. RNA molecules of 22 bases can be polymerized in alkaline hydrothermal vent pores. Thin pores are shown to only accumulate long polynucleotides whereas thick pores accumulate both short and long polynucleotides. Small mineral cavities or mineral gels could have been a compartment for abiogenic processes.

A genomic analysis supports this hypothesis as they found 355 genes that likely traced to LUCA upon 6.1 million sequenced prokaryotic genes. They reconstruct LUCA as a thermophilic anaerobe with a Wood-Ljungdahl pathway, implying an origin of life at white smokers. LUCA would also have exhibited other biochemical pathways such as gluconeogenesis, reverse incomplete Krebs cycle, glycolysis, and the pentose phosphate pathway, including biochemical reactions such as reductive amination and transamination.

===== Carbonate-rich lakes =====
One theory traces the origins of life to the abundant carbonate-rich lakes which would have dotted the early Earth. Phosphate would have been an essential cornerstone to the origin of life since it is a critical component of nucleotides, phospholipids, and adenosine triphosphate. Phosphate is often depleted in natural environments due to its uptake by microbes and its affinity for calcium ions. In a process called 'apatite precipitation', free phosphate ions react with the calcium ions abundant in water to precipitate out of solution as apatite minerals. When attempting to simulate prebiotic phosphorylation, scientists have only found success when using phosphorus levels far above modern day natural concentrations.

This problem of low phosphate is solved in carbonate-rich environments. When in the presence of carbonate, calcium readily reacts to form calcium carbonate instead of apatite minerals. With the free calcium ions removed from solution, phosphate ions are no longer precipitated from solution. This is specifically seen in lakes with no inflow, since no new calcium is introduced into the water body. After all of the calcium is sequestered into calcium carbonate (calcite), phosphate concentrations are able to increase to levels necessary for facilitating biomolecule creation.

Though carbonate-rich lakes have alkaline chemistry in modern times, models suggest that carbonate lakes had a pH low enough for prebiotic synthesis when placed in the acidifying context of Earth's early carbon dioxide rich atmosphere. Rainwater rich in carbonic acid weathered the rock on the surface of the Earth at rates far greater than today. With high phosphate influx, no phosphate precipitation, and no microbial usage of phosphate at this time, models show phosphate reached concentrations approximately 100 times greater than they are today. Modeled pH and phosphate levels of early Earth carbonate-rich lakes nearly match the conditions used in current laboratory experiments on the origin of life.

Similar to the process predicted by geothermal hot spring hypotheses, changing lake levels and wave action deposited phosphorus-rich brine onto dry shore and marginal pools. This drying of the solution promotes polymerization reactions and removes enough water to promote phosphorylation, a process integral to biological energy storage and transfer. When washed away by further precipitation and wave action, researchers concluded these newly formed biomolecules may have washed back into the lake - allowing the first prebiotic syntheses on Earth to occur.

=== Life "seeded" from elsewhere ===
The Panspermia hypothesis does not explain how life arose originally, but simply examines the possibility of its coming from somewhere other than Earth. The idea that life on Earth was "seeded" from elsewhere in the Universe dates back at least to the Greek philosopher Anaximander in the sixth century BCE. In the twentieth century it was proposed by the physical chemist Svante Arrhenius, by the astronomers Fred Hoyle and Chandra Wickramasinghe, and by molecular biologist Francis Crick and chemist Leslie Orgel.

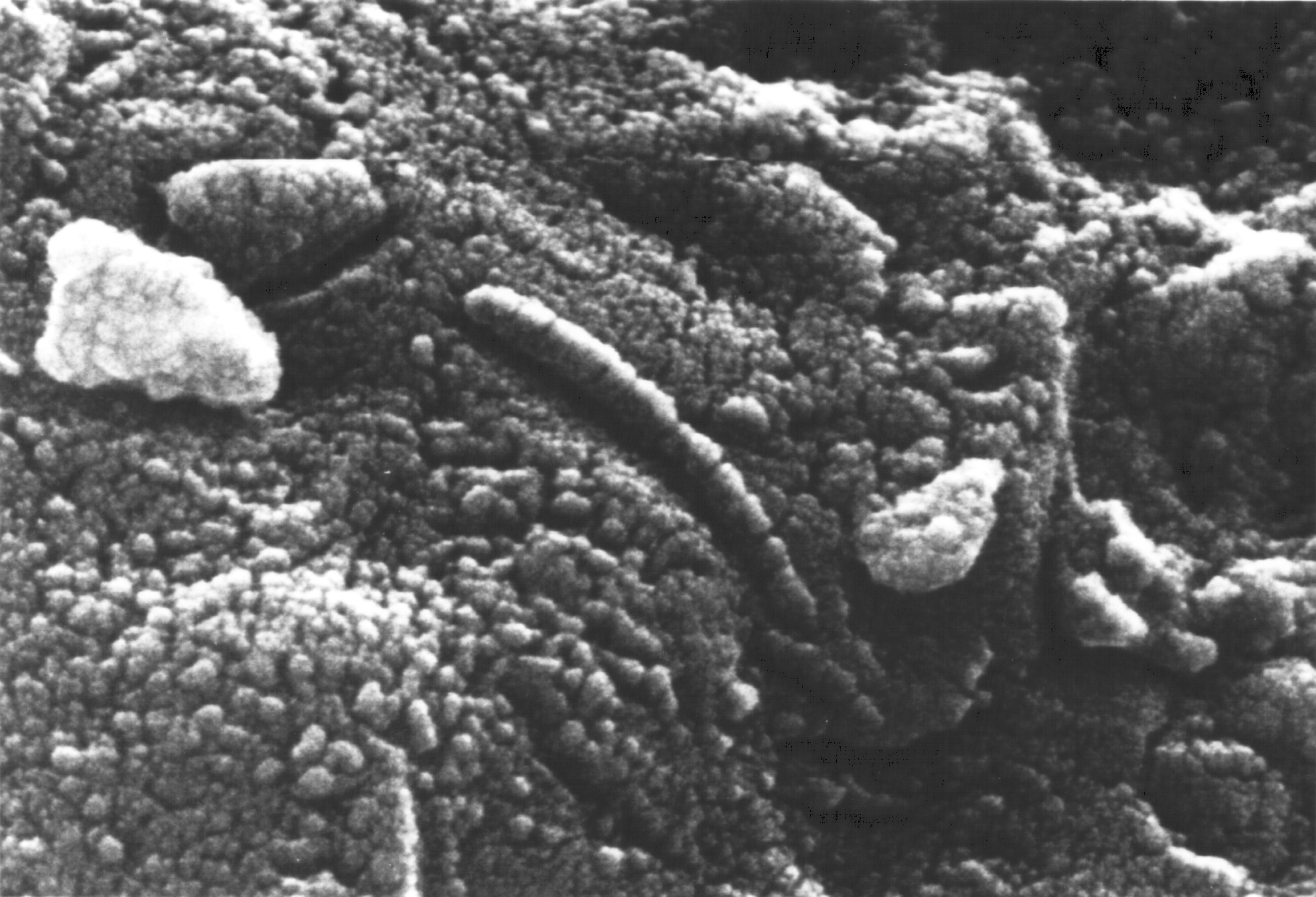
Potential bacterial fossils found on the Allan Hills Meteorite

There are three main versions of the "seeded from elsewhere" hypothesis: from elsewhere in the Solar System via fragments knocked into space by a large meteor impact, in which case the most credible sources are Mars and Venus; by alien visitors, possibly as a result of accidental contamination by microorganisms that they brought with them; and from outside the Solar System but by natural means.

Experiments in low Earth orbit, such as EXOSTACK, have demonstrated that some microorganism spores can survive the shock of being catapulted into space and some can survive exposure to outer space radiation for at least 5.7 years. Meteorite ALH84001, which was once part of the Martian crust, shows evidence of carbonate-globules with texture and size indicative of terrestrial bacterial activity. Scientists are divided over the likelihood of life arising independently on Mars, or on other planets in the Milky Way galaxy.

== Environmental and evolutionary impact of microbial mats ==
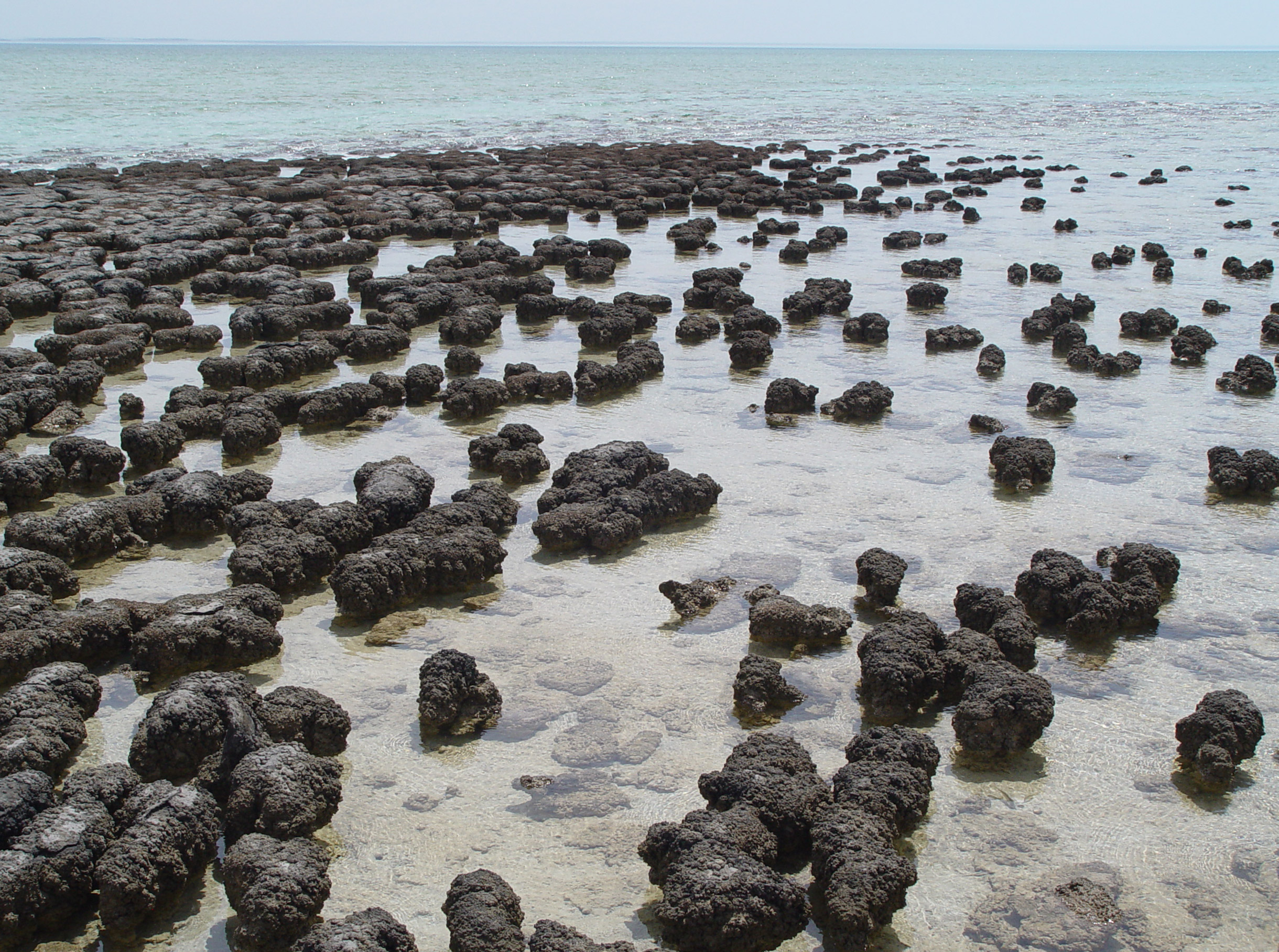
Modern stromatolites in Shark Bay, Western Australia

Microbial mats are multi-layered, multi-species colonies of bacteria and other organisms that are generally only a few millimeters thick, but still contain a wide range of chemical environments, each of which favors a different set of microorganisms. To some extent each mat forms its own food chain, as the by-products of each group of microorganisms generally serve as "food" for adjacent groups.

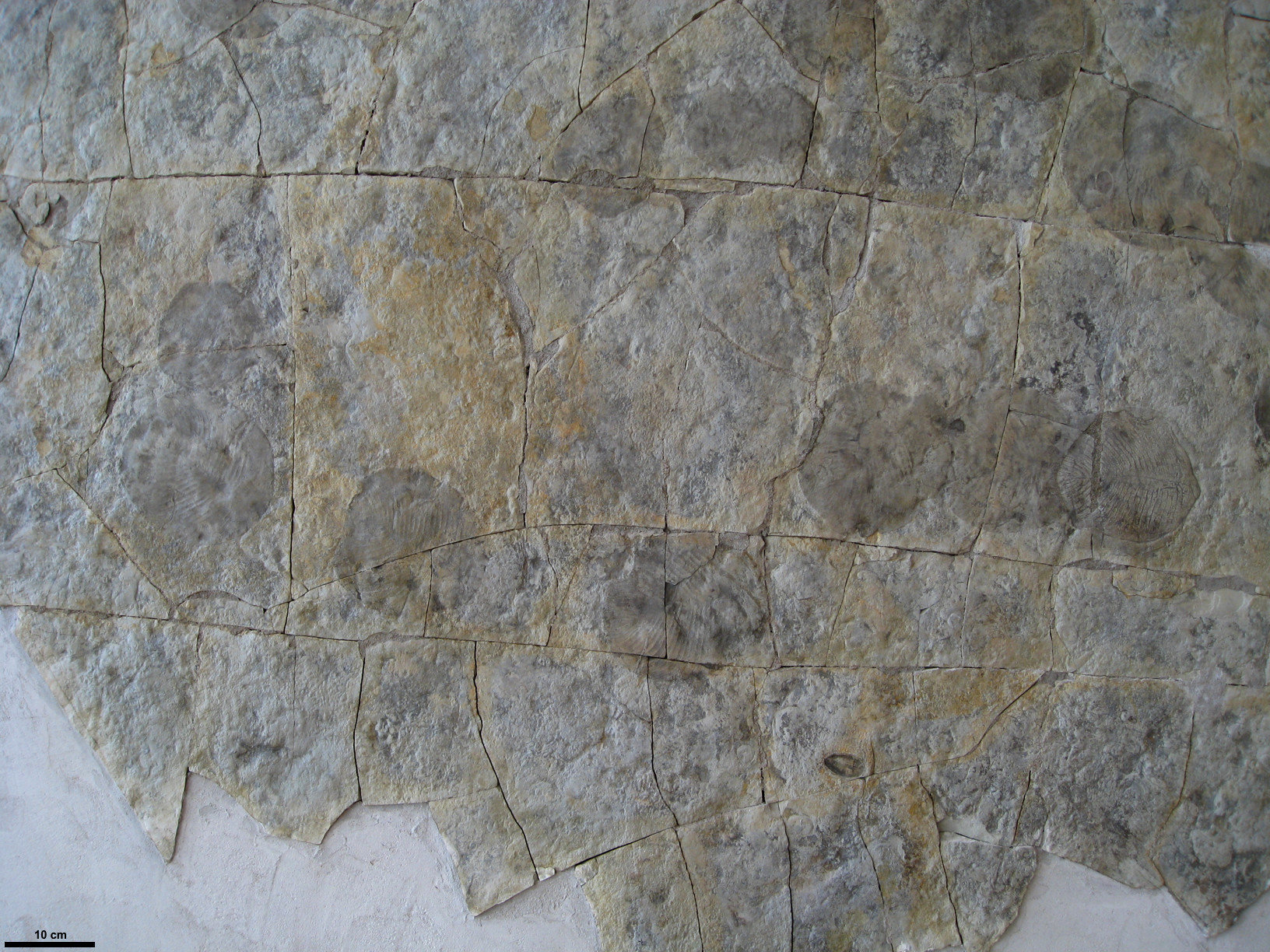
Traces like Epibaion from the Ediacaran represent trace fossils of feeding and movement by members of the phylum proarticulata

Stromatolites are stubby pillars built as microorganisms in mats slowly migrate upwards to avoid being smothered by sediment deposited on them by water. There has been vigorous debate about the validity of alleged stromatolite fossils from before 3 Ga, with critics arguing that they could have been formed by non-biological processes. In 2006, another find of stromatolites was reported from the same part of Australia, in rocks dated to 3.5 Ga.

In modern underwater mats the top layer often consists of photosynthesizing cyanobacteria which create an oxygen-rich environment, while the bottom layer is oxygen-free and often dominated by hydrogen sulfide emitted by the organisms living there. Oxygen is toxic to organisms that are not adapted to it, but greatly increases the metabolic efficiency of oxygen-adapted organisms; oxygenic photosynthesis by bacteria in mats increased biological productivity by a factor of between 100 and 1,000. The source of hydrogen atoms used by oxygenic photosynthesis is water, which is much more plentiful than the geologically produced reducing agents required by the earlier non-oxygenic photosynthesis. From this point onwards life itself produced significantly more of the resources it needed than did geochemical processes.

Oxygen became a significant component of Earth's atmosphere about 2.4 Ga. Although eukaryotes may have been present much earlier, the oxygenation of the atmosphere was a prerequisite for the evolution of the most complex eukaryotic cells, from which all multicellular organisms are built. The boundary between oxygen-rich and oxygen-free layers in microbial mats would have moved upwards when photosynthesis shut down overnight, and then downwards as it resumed on the next day. This would have created selection pressure for organisms in this intermediate zone to acquire the ability to tolerate and then to use oxygen, possibly via endosymbiosis, where one organism lives inside another and both of them benefit from their association.

Cyanobacteria have a versatile range of biochemical machinery. This allows cyanobacteria to be self-sufficient, evolving to survive both as microbial mats and as the oldest kind of phytoplankton. Today, cyanobacteria make up the basis of most marine food chains.

== Diversification of eukaryotes ==
=== Chromatin, nucleus, endomembrane system, and mitochondria ===
Eukaryotes may have been present long before the oxygenation of the atmosphere, but most modern eukaryotes require oxygen, which is used by their mitochondria to fuel the production of ATP, the internal energy supply of all known cells. In the 1970s, a vigorous debate concluded that eukaryotes emerged as a result of a sequence of endosymbiosis between prokaryotes. For example: a predatory microorganism invaded a large prokaryote, probably an archaean, but instead of killing its prey, the attacker took up residence and evolved into mitochondria; one of these chimeras later tried to swallow a photosynthesizing cyanobacterium, but the victim survived inside the attacker and the new combination became the ancestor of plants; and so on. After each endosymbiosis, the partners eventually eliminated unproductive duplication of genetic functions by rearranging their genomes, a process which sometimes involved transfer of genes between them. Another hypothesis proposes that mitochondria were originally sulfur- or hydrogen-metabolizing endosymbionts, and became oxygen-consumers later. On the other hand, mitochondria might have been part of eukaryotes' original equipment.

There is a debate about when eukaryotes first appeared: the presence of steranes in Australian shales may indicate eukaryotes at 2.7 Ga; however, an analysis in 2008 concluded that these chemicals infiltrated the rocks less than 2.2 Ga and prove nothing about the origins of eukaryotes. Fossils of the algae Grypania have been reported in 1.85 billion-year-old rocks (originally dated to 2.1 Ga but later revised), indicating that eukaryotes with organelles had already evolved. A diverse collection of fossil algae were found in rocks dated between 1.5 and 1.4 Ga. The earliest known fossils of fungi date from 1.43 Ga.

=== Plastids ===
Plastids, the superclass of organelles of which chloroplasts are the best-known example, are thought to have originated from endosymbiotic cyanobacteria. The symbiosis evolved around 1.5 Ga and enabled eukaryotes to carry out oxygenic photosynthesis. Three evolutionary lineages of photosynthetic plastids have since emerged: chloroplasts in green algae and plants, rhodoplasts in red algae and cyanelles in the glaucophytes. Not long after this primary endosymbiosis of plastids, rhodoplasts, and chloroplasts were passed down to other bikonts, establishing a eukaryotic assemblage of phytoplankton by the end of the Neoproterozoic Eon.

== Sexual reproduction and multicellular organisms ==
=== Evolution of sexual reproduction ===
The defining characteristics of sexual reproduction in eukaryotes are meiosis and fertilization, resulting in genetic recombination, giving offspring 50% of their genes from each parent. By contrast, in asexual reproduction there is no recombination, but occasional horizontal gene transfer. Bacteria also exchange DNA by bacterial conjugation, enabling the spread of resistance to antibiotics and other toxins, and the ability to utilize new metabolites. However, conjugation is not a means of reproduction, and is not limited to members of the same species – there are cases where bacteria transfer DNA to plants and animals.

On the other hand, bacterial transformation is clearly an adaptation for transfer of DNA between bacteria of the same species. This is a complex process involving the products of numerous bacterial genes and can be regarded as a bacterial form of sex. This process occurs naturally in at least 67 prokaryotic species (in seven different phyla). Sexual reproduction in eukaryotes may have evolved from bacterial transformation.

The disadvantages of sexual reproduction are well-known: the genetic reshuffle of recombination may break up favorable combinations of genes; and since males do not directly increase the number of offspring in the next generation, an asexual population can out-breed and displace in as little as 50 generations a sexual population that is equal in every other respect. Nevertheless, the great majority of animals, plants, fungi and protists reproduce sexually. There is strong evidence that sexual reproduction arose early in the history of eukaryotes and that the genes controlling it have changed very little since then. How sexual reproduction evolved and survived is an unsolved puzzle.

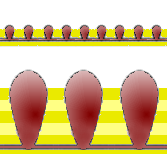
Horodyskia may have been an early metazoan, or a colonial foraminiferan. It apparently re-arranged itself into fewer but larger main masses as the sediment grew deeper round its base.

The Red Queen hypothesis suggests that sexual reproduction provides protection against parasites, because it is easier for parasites to evolve means of overcoming the defenses of genetically identical clones than those of sexual species that present moving targets, and there is some experimental evidence for this. However, there is still doubt about whether it would explain the survival of sexual species if multiple similar clone species were present, as one of the clones may survive the attacks of parasites for long enough to out-breed the sexual species. Furthermore, contrary to the expectations of the Red Queen hypothesis, Kathryn A. Hanley et al. found that the prevalence, abundance and mean intensity of mites was significantly higher in sexual geckos than in asexuals sharing the same habitat. In addition, biologist Matthew Parker, after reviewing numerous genetic studies on plant disease resistance, failed to find a single example consistent with the concept that pathogens are the primary selective agent responsible for sexual reproduction in the host.

Alexey Kondrashov's deterministic mutation hypothesis (DMH) assumes that each organism has more than one harmful mutation and that the combined effects of these mutations are more harmful than the sum of the harm done by each individual mutation. If so, sexual recombination of genes will reduce the harm that bad mutations do to offspring and at the same time eliminate some bad mutations from the gene pool by isolating them in individuals that perish quickly because they have an above-average number of bad mutations. However, the evidence suggests that the DMH's assumptions are shaky because many species have on average less than one harmful mutation per individual and no species that has been investigated shows evidence of synergy between harmful mutations.

The random nature of recombination causes the relative abundance of alternative traits to vary from one generation to another. This genetic drift is insufficient on its own to make sexual reproduction advantageous, but a combination of genetic drift and natural selection may be sufficient. When chance produces combinations of good traits, natural selection gives a large advantage to lineages in which these traits become genetically linked. On the other hand, the benefits of good traits are neutralized if they appear along with bad traits. Sexual recombination gives good traits the opportunities to become linked with other good traits, and mathematical models suggest this may be more than enough to offset the disadvantages of sexual reproduction. Other combinations of hypotheses that are inadequate on their own are also being examined.

The adaptive function of sex remains a major unresolved issue in biology. The competing models to explain it were reviewed by John A. Birdsell and Christopher Wills. The hypotheses discussed above all depend on the possible beneficial effects of random genetic variation produced by genetic recombination. An alternative view is that sex arose and is maintained as a process for repairing DNA damage, and that the genetic variation produced is an occasionally beneficial byproduct.

=== Multicellularity ===
The simplest definitions of "multicellular", for example "having multiple cells", could include colonial cyanobacteria like Nostoc. Even a technical definition such as "having the same genome but different types of cell" would still include some genera of the green algae Volvox, which have cells that specialize in reproduction. Multicellularity evolved independently in organisms as diverse as sponges and other animals, fungi, plants, brown algae, cyanobacteria, slime molds and myxobacteria. For the sake of brevity, this article focuses on the organisms that show the greatest specialization of cells and variety of cell types, although this approach to the evolution of biological complexity could be regarded as "rather anthropocentric".

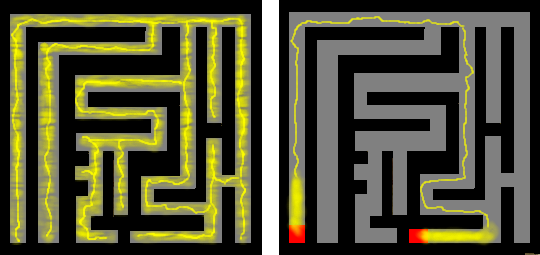
A slime mold solves a maze. The mold (yellow) explored and filled the maze (left). When the researchers placed sugar (red) at two separate points, the mold concentrated most of its mass there and left only the most efficient connection between the two points (right).

The initial advantages of multicellularity may have included: more efficient sharing of nutrients that are digested outside the cell, increased resistance to predators, many of which attacked by engulfing; the ability to resist currents by attaching to a firm surface; the ability to reach upwards to filter-feed or to obtain sunlight for photosynthesis; the ability to create an internal environment that gives protection against the external one; and even the opportunity for a group of cells to behave "intelligently" by sharing information. These features would also have provided opportunities for other organisms to diversify, by creating more varied environments than flat microbial mats could.

Multicellularity with differentiated cells is beneficial to the organism as a whole but disadvantageous from the point of view of individual cells, most of which lose the opportunity to reproduce themselves. In an asexual multicellular organism, rogue cells which retain the ability to reproduce may take over and reduce the organism to a mass of undifferentiated cells. Sexual reproduction eliminates such rogue cells from the next generation and therefore appears to be a prerequisite for complex multicellularity.

The available evidence indicates that eukaryotes evolved much earlier but remained inconspicuous until a rapid diversification around 1 Ga. The only respect in which eukaryotes clearly surpass bacteria and archaea is their capacity for variety of forms, and sexual reproduction enabled eukaryotes to exploit that advantage by producing organisms with multiple cells that differed in form and function.

By comparing the composition of transcription factor families and regulatory network motifs between unicellular organisms and multicellular organisms, scientists found there are many novel transcription factor families and three novel types of regulatory network motifs in multicellular organisms, and novel family transcription factors are preferentially wired into these novel network motifs which are essential for multicellular development. These results propose a plausible mechanism for the contribution of novel-family transcription factors and novel network motifs to the origin of multicellular organisms at transcriptional regulatory level.

=== Fossil evidence ===
Fungi-like fossils were found in vesicular basalt dating back to the Paleoproterozoic Era around 2.4 billion years ago. The controversial Francevillian biota fossils, dated to 2.1 Ga, are the earliest known fossil organisms that are clearly multicellular, if they are indeed fossils. They may have had differentiated cells. Another early multicellular fossil, Qingshania, dated to 1.7 Ga, appears to consist of virtually identical cells. The red algae called Bangiomorpha, dated at 1.2 Ga, is the earliest known organism that certainly has differentiated, specialized cells, and is also the oldest known sexually reproducing organism. The 1.43 billion-year-old fossils interpreted as fungi appear to have been multicellular with differentiated cells. The "string of beads" organism Horodyskia, found in rocks dated from 1.5 Ga to 900 Ma, may have been an early metazoan; however, it has also been interpreted as a colonial foraminifera.

== Emergence of animals ==
- - ParaHoxozoa
    - Bilaterians
      - - Deuterostomes
        - Protostomes
          - Ecdysozoa
          - Spiralia
      - Xenacoelomorpha
    - Cnidaria
    - Placozoa
  - Ctenophora
  - Porifera

The animal family tree

Animals are multicellular eukaryotes, (Note: Myxozoa were thought to be an exception, but are now thought to be heavily modified members of the Cnidaria. Jímenez-Guri, Eva; Philippe, Hervé; Okamura, Beth; et al. (July 6, 2007). "Buddenbrockia Is a Cnidarian Worm". Science. 317 (5834): 116–118. Bibcode:2007Sci...317..116J. doi:10.1126/science.1142024. ISSN 0036-8075. PMID 17615357. S2CID 5170702.) and are distinguished from plants, algae, and fungi by lacking cell walls. All animals are motile, if only at certain life stages. All animals except sponges have bodies differentiated into separate tissues, including muscles, which move parts of the animal by contracting, and nerve tissue, which transmits and processes signals. In November 2019, researchers reported the discovery of Caveasphaera, a multicellular organism found in 609-million-year-old rocks, that is not easily defined as an animal or non-animal, which may be related to one of the earliest instances of animal evolution. Fossil studies of Caveasphaera have suggested that animal-like embryonic development arose much earlier than the oldest clearly defined animal fossils. and may be consistent with studies suggesting that animal evolution may have begun about 750 million years ago.

Nonetheless, the earliest widely accepted animal fossils are the rather modern-looking cnidarians (the group that includes jellyfish, sea anemones and Hydra), possibly from around 580 Ma, although fossils from the Doushantuo Formation can only be dated approximately. Their presence implies that the cnidarian and bilaterian lineages had already diverged.

The Ediacara biota, which flourished for the last 40 million years before the start of the Cambrian, were the first animals more than a very few centimeters long. Many were flat and had a "quilted" appearance, and seemed so strange that there was a proposal to classify them as a separate kingdom, Vendobionta. Others, however, have been interpreted as early molluscs (Kimberella), echinoderms (Arkarua), and arthropods (Spriggina, Parvancorina). There is still debate about the classification of these specimens, mainly because the diagnostic features which allow taxonomists to classify more recent organisms, such as similarities to living organisms, are generally absent in the Ediacarans. However, there seems little doubt that Kimberella was at least a triploblastic bilaterian animal, in other words, an animal significantly more complex than the cnidarians.

The small shelly fauna are a very mixed collection of fossils found between the Late Ediacaran and Middle Cambrian periods. The earliest, Cloudina, shows signs of successful defense against predation and may indicate the start of an evolutionary arms race. Some tiny Early Cambrian shells almost certainly belonged to molluscs, while the owners of some "armor plates", Halkieria and Microdictyon, were eventually identified when more complete specimens were found in Cambrian lagerstätten that preserved soft-bodied animals.

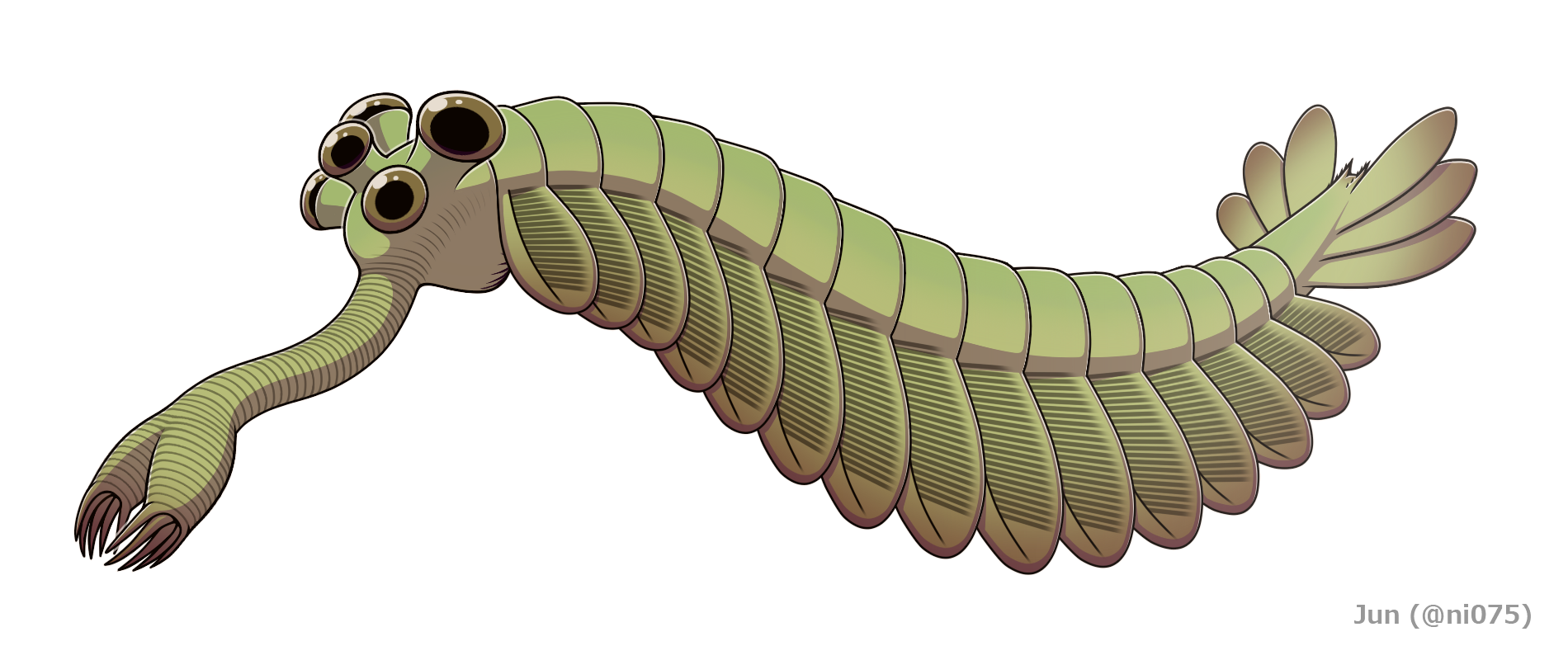
Opabinia made the largest single contribution to modern interest in the Cambrian explosion.

In the 1970s there was already a debate about whether the emergence of the modern phyla was "explosive" or gradual but hidden by the shortage of Precambrian animal fossils. A re-analysis of fossils from the Burgess Shale lagerstätte increased interest in the issue when it revealed animals, such as Opabinia, which did not fit into any known phylum. At the time these were interpreted as evidence that the modern phyla had evolved very rapidly in the Cambrian explosion and that the Burgess Shale's "weird wonders" showed that the Early Cambrian was a uniquely experimental period of animal evolution. Later discoveries of similar animals and the development of new theoretical approaches led to the conclusion that many of the "weird wonders" were evolutionary "aunts" or "cousins" of modern groups—for example that Opabinia was a member of the lobopods, a group which includes the ancestors of the arthropods, and that it may have been closely related to the modern tardigrades. Nevertheless, there is still much debate about whether the Cambrian explosion was really explosive and, if so, how and why it happened and why it appears unique in the history of animals.

=== Deuterostomes and the first vertebrates ===
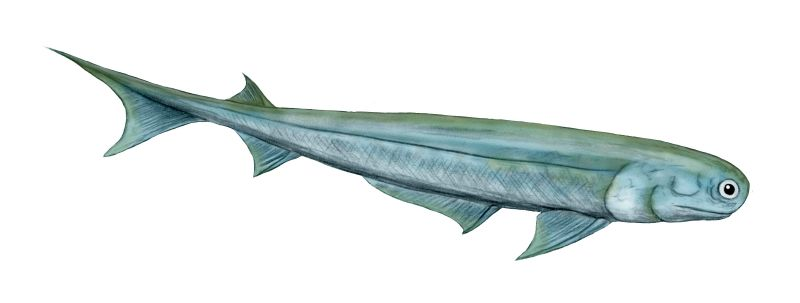
Acanthodians were among the earliest vertebrates with jaws.

Most of the animals at the heart of the Cambrian explosion debate were protostomes, one of the two main groups of complex animals. The other major group, the deuterostomes, contains invertebrates such as starfish and sea urchins (echinoderms), as well as chordates (see below). Many echinoderms have hard calcite "shells", which are fairly common from the Early Cambrian small shelly fauna onwards. Other deuterostome groups are soft-bodied, and most of the significant Cambrian deuterostome fossils come from the Chengjiang fauna, a lagerstätte in China. The chordates are another major deuterostome group: animals with a distinct dorsal nerve cord. Chordates include soft-bodied invertebrates such as tunicates as well as vertebrates—animals with a backbone. While tunicate fossils predate the Cambrian explosion, the Chengjiang fossils Haikouichthys and Myllokunmingia appear to be true vertebrates, and Haikouichthys had distinct vertebrae, which may have been slightly mineralized. Vertebrates with jaws, such as the acanthodians, first appeared in the Late Ordovician.

== Colonization of land ==
Adaptation to life on land is a major challenge: all land organisms need to avoid drying-out and all those above microscopic size must create special structures to withstand gravity; respiration and gas exchange systems have to change; reproductive systems cannot depend on water to carry eggs and sperm towards each other.

Although the earliest good evidence of land plants and animals dates back to the Ordovician period (488 to 444 Ma), and a number of microorganism lineages made it onto land much earlier, modern land ecosystems only appeared in the Late Devonian, about 385 to 359 Ma. In May 2017, evidence of the earliest known life on land may have been found in 3.48-billion-year-old geyserite and other related mineral deposits (often found around hot springs and geysers) uncovered in the Pilbara Craton of Western Australia. In July 2018, scientists reported that the earliest life on land may have been bacteria living on land 3.22 billion years ago. In May 2019, scientists reported the discovery of a fossilized fungus, named Ourasphaira giraldae, in the Canadian Arctic, that may have grown on land a billion years ago, well before plants were living on land.

=== Evolution of terrestrial antioxidants ===
3 Ga ago, Earth's oxygen began, as a by-product of photosynthesis. However, oxygen produces destructive chemical oxidation which was toxic to most previous organisms.

=== Evolution of soil ===
Before the colonization of land there was no soil, a combination of mineral particles and decomposed organic matter. Land surfaces were either bare rock or shifting sand produced by weathering. Water and dissolved nutrients would have drained away very quickly. In the Sub-Cambrian peneplain in Sweden, for example, maximum depth of kaolinitization by Neoproterozoic weathering is about 5 m, while nearby kaolin deposits developed in the Mesozoic are much thicker. It has been argued that in the late Neoproterozoic sheet wash was a dominant process of erosion of surface material due to the lack of plants on land.

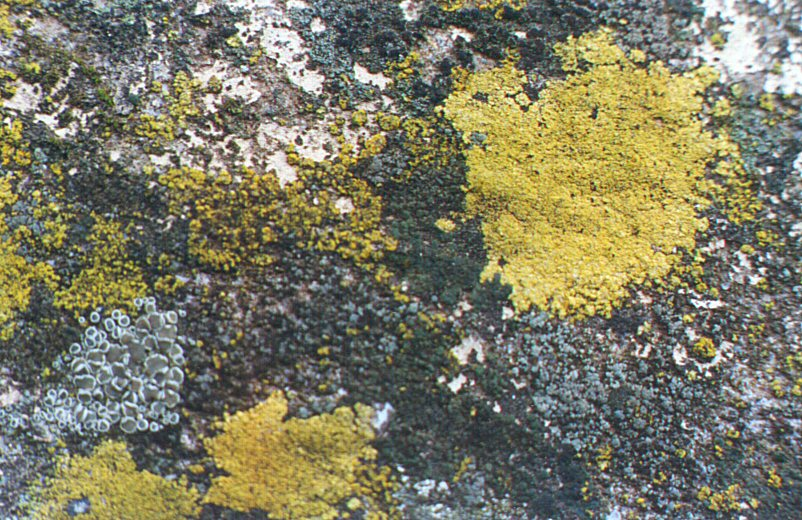
Lichens growing on concrete

Films of cyanobacteria, which are not plants but use the same photosynthesis mechanisms, have been found in modern deserts in areas unsuitable for vascular plants. This suggests that microbial mats may have been the first organisms to colonize dry land, possibly in the Precambrian. Mat-forming cyanobacteria could have gradually evolved resistance to desiccation as they spread from the seas to intertidal zones and then to land. Lichens, which are symbiotic combinations of a fungus (almost always an ascomycete) and one or more photosynthesizers (green algae or cyanobacteria), are also important colonizers of lifeless environments, and their ability to break down rocks contributes to soil formation where plants cannot survive. The earliest known ascomycete fossils date from 423 to 419 Ma in the Silurian.

Soil formation would have been very slow until the appearance of burrowing animals, which mix the mineral and organic components of soil and whose feces are a major source of organic components. Burrows have been found in Ordovician sediments, and are attributed to annelids (worms) or arthropods.

=== Plants and the Late Devonian wood crisis ===
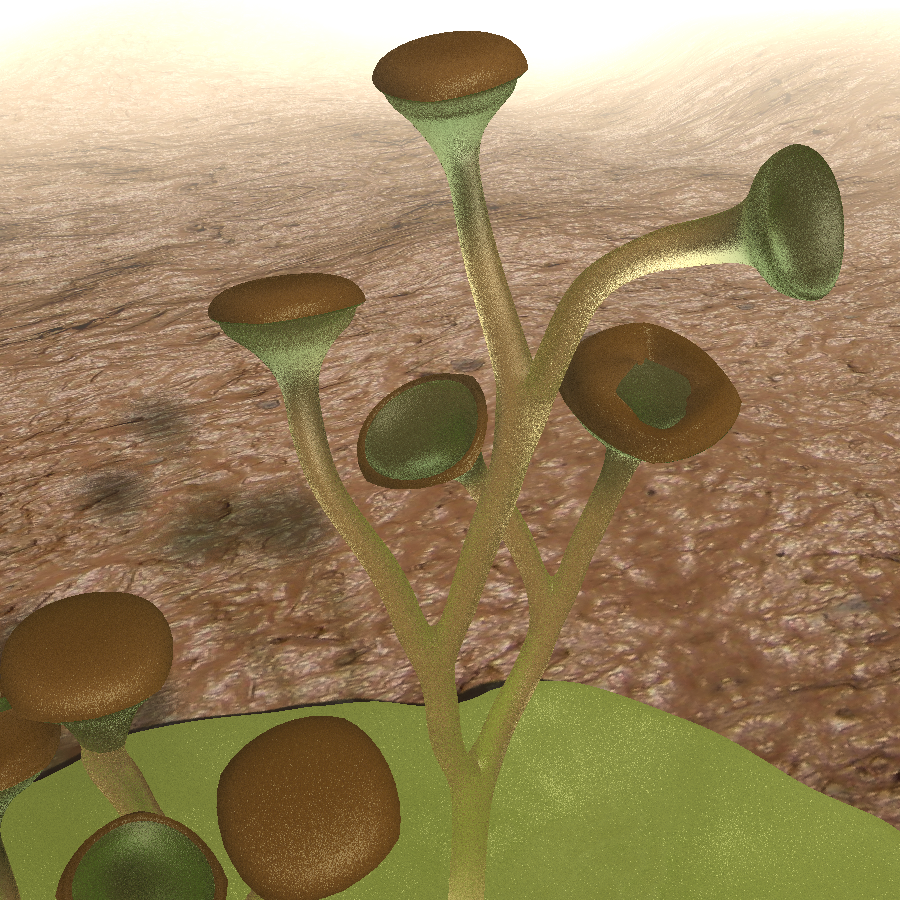
Reconstruction of Cooksonia, a vascular plant from the Silurian

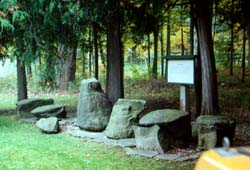
Fossilized trees from the Middle Devonian Gilboa Fossil Forest

In aquatic algae, almost all cells are capable of photosynthesis and are nearly independent. Life on land requires plants to become internally more complex and specialized: photosynthesis is most efficient at the top; roots extract water and nutrients from the ground; and the intermediate parts support and transport.

Spores of land plants resembling liverworts have been found in Middle Ordovician rocks from 476 Ma. Middle Silurian rocks from 430 Ma contain fossils of true plants, including clubmosses such as Baragwanathia; most were under 10 centimetres (3.9 in) high, and some appear closely related to vascular plants, the group that includes trees.

By the Late Devonian 370 Ma, abundant trees such as Archaeopteris bound the soil so firmly that they changed river systems from mostly braided to mostly meandering. This caused the "Late Devonian wood crisis" because:

- They removed more carbon dioxide from the atmosphere, reducing the greenhouse effect and thus causing an ice age in the Carboniferous period. This did not repeat in later ecosystems, since the carbon dioxide "locked up" in wood was returned to the atmosphere by decomposition of dead wood, but the earliest fossil evidence of fungi that can decompose wood also comes from the Late Devonian.
- The increasing depth of plants' roots led to more washing of nutrients into rivers and seas by rain. This caused algal blooms whose high consumption of oxygen caused anoxic events in deeper waters, increasing the extinction rate among deep-water animals.

=== Land invertebrates ===
Animals had to change their feeding and excretory systems, and most land animals developed internal fertilization of their eggs. The difference in refractive index between water and air required changes in their eyes. On the other hand, in some ways movement and breathing became easier, and the better transmission of high-frequency sounds in the air encouraged the development of hearing.

About 100 million years before full terrestrialization evolved, animals would visit land for short amounts of time. Trace fossils from the early Cambrian suggests mollusc-like animals could spend at least 15 minutes on land. The oldest animal with evidence of air-breathing, although not being the oldest myriapod fossil record, is Pneumodesmus, an archipolypodan millipede from the Early Devonian, about 414 Ma. Its air-breathing, terrestrial nature is evidenced by the presence of spiracles, the openings to tracheal systems. However, some earlier trace fossils from the Cambrian-Ordovician boundary about 490 Ma are interpreted as the tracks of large amphibious arthropods on coastal sand dunes, and may have been made by euthycarcinoids, which are thought to be evolutionary "aunts" of myriapods. Other trace fossils from the Late Ordovician a little over 445 Ma probably represent land invertebrates, and there is clear evidence of numerous arthropods on coasts and alluvial plains shortly before the Silurian-Devonian boundary, about 415 Ma, including signs that some arthropods ate plants. Arthropods were well pre-adapted to colonize land, because their existing jointed exoskeletons provided protection against desiccation, support against gravity and a means of locomotion that was not dependent on water.

The fossil record of other major invertebrate groups on land is poor: none at all for non-parasitic flatworms, nematodes or nemerteans; some parasitic nematodes have been fossilized in amber; annelid worm fossils are known from the Carboniferous, but they may still have been aquatic animals; the earliest fossils of gastropods on land date from the Late Carboniferous, and this group may have had to wait until leaf litter became abundant enough to provide the moist conditions they need.

The earliest confirmed fossils of flying insects date from the Late Carboniferous, but it is thought that insects developed the ability to fly in the Early Carboniferous or even Late Devonian. This gave them a wider range of ecological niches for feeding and breeding, and a means of escape from predators and from unfavorable changes in the environment. About 99% of modern insect species fly or are descendants of flying species.

=== Amphibians ===
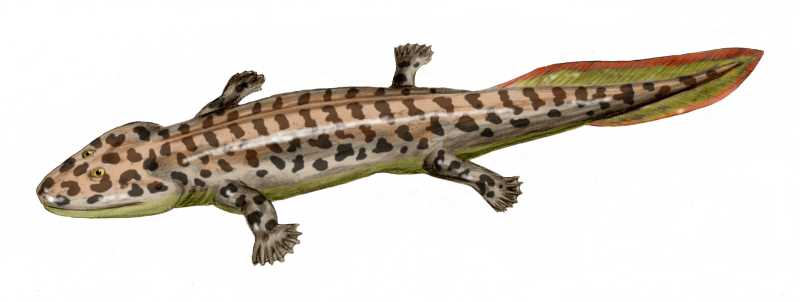
Acanthostega changed views about the early evolution of tetrapods.

- "Fish"
  - Osteolepiformes
  - - Panderichthyidae
    - - Obruchevichthidae
      - - Acanthostega
        - - Ichthyostega
          - - Tulerpeton
            - - Early labyrinthodonts
              - - Anthracosauria
                - Amniotes

Family tree of tetrapods

Tetrapods, vertebrates with four limbs, evolved from other rhipidistian fish over a relatively short timespan during the Late Devonian (370 to 360 Ma). The early groups are grouped together as Labyrinthodontia. They retained aquatic, fry-like tadpoles, a system still seen in modern amphibians.

Iodine and T4/T3 stimulate the amphibian metamorphosis and the evolution of nervous systems transforming the aquatic, vegetarian tadpole into a "more developed" terrestrial, carnivorous frog with better neurological, visuospatial, olfactory and cognitive abilities for hunting. The new hormonal action of T3 was made possible by the formation of T3-receptors in the cells of vertebrates. First, about 600–500 million years ago, the alpha T3-receptors with a metamorphosing action appeared in primitive chordates and then, about 250–150 million years ago, the beta T3-receptors with metabolic and thermogenetic actions appeared in birds and mammals.

From the 1950s to the early 1980s it was thought that tetrapods evolved from fish that had already acquired the ability to crawl on land, possibly in order to go from a pool that was drying out to one that was deeper. However, in 1987, nearly complete fossils of Acanthostega from about 363 Ma showed that this Late Devonian transitional animal had legs and both lungs and gills, but could never have survived on land: its limbs and its wrist and ankle joints were too weak to bear its weight; its ribs were too short to prevent its lungs from being squeezed flat by its weight; its fish-like tail fin would have been damaged by dragging on the ground. The current hypothesis is that Acanthostega, which was about 1 metre (3.3 ft) long, was a wholly aquatic predator that hunted in shallow water. Its skeleton differed from that of most fish, in ways that enabled it to raise its head to breathe air while its body remained submerged, including: its jaws show modifications that would have enabled it to gulp air; the bones at the back of its skull are locked together, providing strong attachment points for muscles that raised its head; the head is not joined to the shoulder girdle and it has a distinct neck.

The Devonian proliferation of land plants may help to explain why air breathing would have been an advantage: leaves falling into streams and rivers would have encouraged the growth of aquatic vegetation; this would have attracted grazing invertebrates and small fish that preyed on them; they would have been attractive prey but the environment was unsuitable for the big marine predatory fish; air-breathing would have been necessary because these waters would have been short of oxygen, since warm water holds less dissolved oxygen than cooler marine water and since the decomposition of vegetation would have used some of the oxygen.

Later discoveries revealed earlier transitional forms between Acanthostega and completely fish-like animals. Unfortunately, there is then a gap (Romer's gap) of about 30 Ma between the fossils of ancestral tetrapods and Middle Carboniferous fossils of vertebrates that look well-adapted for life on land, during which only some fossils are found, which had five digits in the terminating point of the four limbs, showing true or crown tetrapods appeared in the gap around 350 Ma. Some of the fossils after this gap look as if the animals which they belonged to were early relatives of modern amphibians, all of which need to keep their skins moist and to lay their eggs in water, while others are accepted as early relatives of the amniotes, whose waterproof skin and egg membranes enable them to live and breed far from water. The Carboniferous Rainforest Collapse may have paved the way for amniotes to become dominant over amphibians.

=== Reptiles ===
- Amniotes
  - Synapsids
    - Early synapsids (extinct)
    - Pelycosaurs
      - Extinct pelycosaurs
      - Therapsids
        - Extinct therapsids
        - Mammaliaformes
          - Extinct mammaliaforms
          - Mammals
  - Sauropsids
    - - Anapsids; whether turtles belong here is debated
      - - Captorhinidae and Protorothyrididae (extinct)
        - Diapsids
          - Araeoscelidia (extinct)
          - - Squamata (lizards and snakes)
            - Archosaurs
              - Extinct archosaurs
              - Crocodilians
              - - Pterosaurs (extinct)
                - Dinosaurs
                  - - Theropods
                      - Extinct
                        theropods
                      - Birds
                    - Sauropods
                      (extinct)
                  - Ornithischians (extinct)

Possible family tree of dinosaurs, birds and mammals

Amniotes, whose eggs can survive in dry environments, probably evolved in the Late Carboniferous period (330 to 298.9 Ma). The earliest fossils of the two surviving amniote groups, synapsids and sauropsids, date from around 313 Ma. The synapsid pelycosaurs and their descendants the therapsids are the most common land vertebrates in the best-known Permian (298.9 to 251.9 Ma) fossil beds. However, at the time these were all in temperate zones at middle latitudes, and there is evidence that hotter, drier environments nearer the Equator were dominated by sauropsids and amphibians.

The Permian–Triassic extinction event wiped out almost all land vertebrates, as well as the great majority of other life. During the slow recovery from this catastrophe, estimated to have taken 30 million years, a previously obscure sauropsid group became the most abundant and diverse terrestrial vertebrates: a few fossils of archosauriformes ("ruling lizard forms") have been found in Late Permian rocks, but, by the Middle Triassic, archosaurs were the dominant land vertebrates. Dinosaurs distinguished themselves from other archosaurs in the Late Triassic, and became the dominant land vertebrates of the Jurassic and Cretaceous periods (201.4 to 66 Ma).

=== Birds ===
During the Late Jurassic, birds evolved from small, predatory theropod dinosaurs. The first birds inherited teeth and long, bony tails from their dinosaur ancestors, but some had developed horny, toothless beaks by the very Late Jurassic and short pygostyle tails by the Early Cretaceous.

=== Mammals ===
While the archosaurs and dinosaurs were becoming more dominant in the Triassic, the mammaliaform successors of the therapsids evolved into small, mainly nocturnal insectivores. This ecological role may have promoted the evolution of mammals, for example nocturnal life may have accelerated the development of endothermy ("warm-bloodedness") and hair or fur. By 195 Ma in the Early Jurassic there were animals that were very like today's mammals in a number of respects. Unfortunately, there is a gap in the fossil record throughout the Middle Jurassic. However, fossil teeth discovered in Madagascar indicate that the split between the lineage leading to monotremes and the one leading to other living mammals had occurred by 167 Ma. After dominating land vertebrate niches for about 150 Ma, the non-avian dinosaurs perished in the Cretaceous–Paleogene extinction event (66 Ma) along with many other groups of organisms. Mammals throughout the time of the dinosaurs had been restricted to a narrow range of taxa, sizes and shapes, but increased rapidly in size and diversity after the extinction, with bats taking to the air within 13 million years, and cetaceans to the sea within 15 million years.

=== Flowering plants ===
- Gymnosperms
  - - - - Gnetales
          (gymnosperm)
        - Welwitschia
          (gymnosperm)
      - Ephedra
        (gymnosperm)
    - Bennettitales
    - Angiosperms
      (flowering plants)

One possible family tree of flowering plants

- Gymnosperms
  - Angiosperms
    (flowering plants)
  - - - - Cycads
          (gymnosperm)
        - Bennettitales
      - Ginkgo
    - - Gnetales
        (gymnosperm)
      - Conifers
        (gymnosperm)

Another possible family tree

The first flowering plants appeared around 130 Ma. The 250,000 to 400,000 species of flowering plants outnumber all other ground plants combined, and are the dominant vegetation in most terrestrial ecosystems. There is fossil evidence that flowering plants diversified rapidly in the Early Cretaceous, from 130 to 90 Ma, and that their rise was associated with that of pollinating insects. Among modern flowering plants Magnolia are thought to be close to the common ancestor of the group. However, paleontologists have not succeeded in identifying the earliest stages in the evolution of flowering plants.

=== Social insects ===
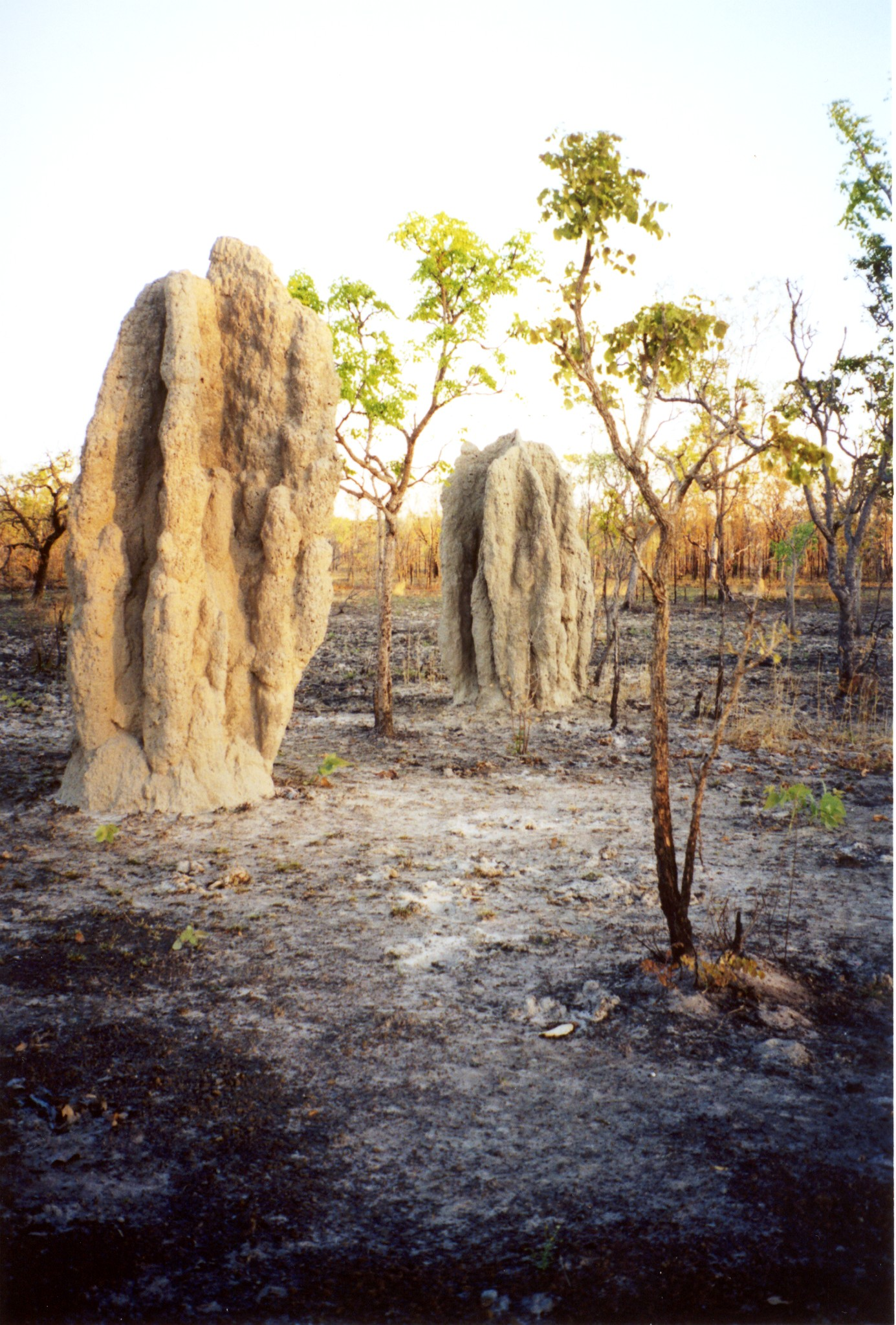
These termite mounds have survived a bush fire.

The social insects are remarkable because the great majority of individuals in each colony are sterile. This appears contrary to basic concepts of evolution such as natural selection and the selfish gene. In fact, there are very few eusocial insect species: only 15 out of approximately 2,600 living families of insects contain eusocial species, and it seems that eusociality has evolved independently only 12 times among arthropods, although some eusocial lineages have diversified into several families. Nevertheless, social insects have been spectacularly successful; for example although ants and termites account for only about 2% of known insect species, they form over 50% of the total mass of insects. Their ability to control a territory appears to be the foundation of their success.

The sacrifice of breeding opportunities by most individuals has long been explained as a consequence of these species' unusual haplodiploid method of sex determination, which has the paradoxical consequence that two sterile worker daughters of the same queen share more genes with each other than they would with their offspring if they could breed. However, E. O. Wilson and Bert Hölldobler argue that this explanation is faulty: for example, it is based on kin selection, but there is no evidence of nepotism in colonies that have multiple queens. Instead, they write, eusociality evolves only in species that are under strong pressure from predators and competitors, but in environments where it is possible to build "fortresses"; after colonies have established this security, they gain other advantages through co-operative foraging. In support of this explanation they cite the appearance of eusociality in bathyergid mole rats, which are not haplodiploid.

The earliest fossils of insects have been found in Early Devonian rocks from about 400 Ma, which preserve only a few varieties of flightless insect. The Mazon Creek lagerstätten from the Late Carboniferous, about 300 Ma, include about 200 species, some gigantic by modern standards, and indicate that insects had occupied their main modern ecological niches as herbivores, detritivores and insectivores. Social termites and ants first appeared in the Early Cretaceous, and advanced social bees have been found in Late Cretaceous rocks but did not become abundant until the Middle Cenozoic.

=== Humans ===
The idea that, along with other life forms, modern-day humans evolved from an ancient, common ancestor was proposed by Robert Chambers in 1844 and taken up by Charles Darwin in 1871. Modern humans evolved from a lineage of upright-walking apes that has been traced back over 6 Ma to Sahelanthropus. The first known stone tools were made about 2.5 Ma, apparently by Australopithecus garhi, and were found near animal bones that bear scratches made by these tools. The earliest hominines had chimpanzee-sized brains, but there has been a fourfold increase in the last 3 Ma; a statistical analysis suggests that hominine brain sizes depend almost completely on the date of the fossils, while the species to which they are assigned has only slight influence. There is a long-running debate about whether modern humans evolved all over the world simultaneously from existing advanced hominines or are descendants of a single small population in Africa, which then migrated all over the world less than 200,000 years ago and replaced previous hominine species. There is also debate about whether anatomically modern humans had an intellectual, cultural and technological "Great Leap Forward" under 40,000–50,000 years ago and, if so, whether this was due to neurological changes that are not visible in fossils.

== Mass extinctions ==

Apparent extinction intensity, i.e. the fraction of genera going extinct at any given time, as reconstructed from the fossil record. (Graph not meant to include the recent, ongoing Holocene extinction event).

Life on Earth has suffered occasional mass extinctions at least since 542 Ma. Although they were disasters at the time, mass extinctions have sometimes accelerated the evolution of life on Earth. When dominance of particular ecological niches passes from one group of organisms to another, it is rarely because the new dominant group is "superior" to the old and usually because an extinction event eliminates the old dominant group and makes way for the new one.

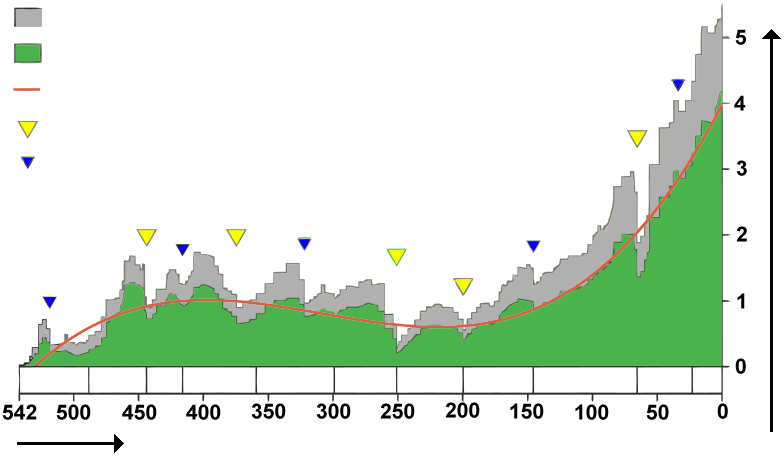
Phanerozoic biodiversity as shown by the fossil record

The fossil record appears to show that the gaps between mass extinctions are becoming longer and that the average and background rates of extinction are decreasing. Both of these phenomena could be explained in one or more ways:

- The oceans may have become more hospitable to life over the last 500 Ma and less vulnerable to mass extinctions: dissolved oxygen became more widespread and penetrated to greater depths; the development of life on land reduced the run-off of nutrients and hence the risk of eutrophication and anoxic events; and marine ecosystems became more diversified so that food chains were less likely to be disrupted.
- Reasonably complete fossils are very rare, most extinct organisms are represented only by partial fossils, and complete fossils are rarest in the oldest rocks. So paleontologists have mistakenly assigned parts of the same organism to different genera, which were often defined solely to accommodate these finds—the story of Anomalocaris is an example of this. The risk of this mistake is higher for older fossils because these are often both unlike parts of any living organism and poorly conserved. Many of the "superfluous" genera are represented by fragments which are not found again and the "superfluous" genera appear to become extinct very quickly.

Biodiversity in the fossil record, which is "...the number of distinct genera alive at any given time; that is, those whose first occurrence predates and whose last occurrence postdates that time" shows a different trend: a fairly swift rise from 542 to 400 Ma; a slight decline from 400 to 200 Ma, in which the devastating Permian–Triassic extinction event is an important factor; and a swift rise from 200 Ma to the present.

== See also ==
- History of evolutionary thought
- On the Origin of Species
- Phylogenetics
- Speciation
- Taxonomy of commonly fossilised invertebrates
- Treatise on Invertebrate Paleontology
- Viral evolution
- Sapiens: A Brief History of Humankind

== Bibliography ==
- Arrhenius, Svante (1980) [Arrhenius paper originally published 1903]. "The Propagation of Life in Space". In Goldsmith, Donald (ed.). The Quest for Extraterrestrial Life: A Book of Readings. Foreword by Sir Fred Hoyle. Mill Valley, CA: University Science Books. Bibcode:1980qel..book...32A. ISBN 978-0-935702-02-6. LCCN 79057423. OCLC 7121102.
- Bengtson, Stefan (2004). "Early Skeletal Fossils". In Lipps, Jere H.; Waggoner, Benjamin M. (eds.). Neoproterozoic-Cambrian Biological Revolutions: Presented as a Paleontological Society Short Course at the Annual Meeting of the Geological Society of America, Denver, Colorado, November 6, 2004. Paleontological Society Papers. Vol. 10. New Haven, CT: Yale University Reprographics & Imaging Service; Paleontological Society. OCLC 57481790.
- Bennett, Jeffrey O. (2008). Beyond UFOs: The Search for Extraterrestrial Life and Its Astonishing Implications for Our Future. Princeton, NJ: Princeton University Press. Bibcode:2008buse.book.....B. ISBN 978-0-691-13549-6. LCCN 2007037872. OCLC 172521761.
- Benton, Michael J. (1997). Vertebrate Palaeontology (2nd ed.). London: Chapman & Hall. ISBN 978-0-412-73800-5. OCLC 37378512.
- Benton, Michael J. (2005) [Originally published 2003]. When Life Nearly Died: The Greatest Mass Extinction of All Time (1st paperback ed.). London: Thames & Hudson. ISBN 978-0-500-28573-2. LCCN 2002109744. OCLC 62145244.
- Benton, Michael J. (2005). Vertebrate Palaeontology (3rd ed.). Malden, MA: Blackwell Science. ISBN 978-0-632-05637-8. LCCN 2003028152. OCLC 53970617.
- Bernstein, Harris; Bernstein, Carol; Michod, Richard E. (2012). "DNA Repair as the Primary Adaptive Function of Sex in Bacteria and Eukaryotes". In Kimura, Sakura; Shimizu, Sora (eds.). DNA Repair: New Research. Hauppauge, NY: Nova Science Publishers. ISBN 978-1-62100-808-8. LCCN 2011038504. OCLC 828424701. Archived from the original on 2013-10-29.
- Bernstein, Harris; Hopf, Frederic A.; Michod, Richard E. (1987). "The Molecular Basis of the Evolution of Sex". In Scandalios, John G. (ed.). Molecular Genetics of Development. Advances in Genetics. Vol. 24. San Diego, CA: Academic Press. pp. 323–70. doi:10.1016/s0065-2660(08)60012-7. ISBN 978-0-12-017624-3. OCLC 646754753. PMID 3324702.
- Birdsell, John A.; Wills, Christopher (2003). "The Evolutionary Origin and Maintenance of Sexual Recombination: A Review of Contemporary Models". In MacIntyre, Ross J.; Clegg, Michael T. (eds.). Evolutionary Biology. Vol. 33. New York: Springer Science+Business Media. ISBN 978-1-4419-3385-0. OCLC 751583918.
- Briggs, Derek E. G.; Crowther, Peter R., eds. (2001). Palaeobiology II. Foreword by E. N. K. Clarkson. Malden, MA: Blackwell Science. ISBN 978-0-632-05149-6. LCCN 0632051477. OCLC 43945263.
- Cairns-Smith, A. G. (1968). "An Approach to a Blueprint for a Primitive Organism". In Waddington, C. H (ed.). Towards a Theoretical Biology. Vol. 1. Edinburgh, Scotland: Edinburgh University Press. ISBN 978-0-85224-018-2. LCCN 71419832. OCLC 230043266.
- Chapman, Arthur D. (2009). Numbers of Living Species in Australia and the World (2nd ed.). Canberra: Australian Biological Resources Study. ISBN 978-0-642-56860-1. OCLC 780539206. Archived from the original on 2016-12-25.
- Clancy, Paul; Brack, André; Horneck, Gerda (2005). Looking for Life, Searching the Solar System. Cambridge; New York: Cambridge University Press. ISBN 978-0-521-82450-7. LCCN 2006271630. OCLC 57574490.
- Cowen, Richard (2000). History of Life (3rd ed.). Malden, MA: Blackwell Science. ISBN 978-0-632-04444-3. LCCN 99016542. OCLC 47011068.
- Cunnane, Stephen C.; Stewart, Kathlyn M., eds. (2010). Environmental Influences on Human Brain Evolution. John Wiley & Sons. ISBN 978-0-470-45268-4. LCCN 2009047979. OCLC 940843566.
- Dalrymple, G. Brent (1991). The Age of the Earth. Stanford, CA: Stanford University Press. ISBN 978-0-8047-1569-0. LCCN 90047051. OCLC 22347190.
- Futuyma, Douglas J. (2005). Evolution. Sunderland, MA: Sinauer Associates. ISBN 978-0-87893-187-3. LCCN 2004029808. OCLC 57311264.
- Gauthier, Jacques; Cannatella, David C.; de Queiroz, Kevin; et al. (1989). "Tetrapod phylogeny". In Fernholm, Bo; Bremer, Kåre; Jörnvall, Hans (eds.). The Hierarchy of Life: Molecules and Morphology in Phylogenetic Analysis. International Congress Series. Vol. 824. Amsterdam, the Netherlands; New York: Excerpta Medica/Elsevier Science Publishers B.V. (Biomedical Division). ISBN 978-0-444-81073-1. LCCN 89001132. OCLC 19129518. "Proceedings from Nobel Symposium 70 held at Alfred Nobel's Björkborn, Karlskoga, Sweden, August 29 – September 2, 1988"
- Gee, Henry, ed. (2000). Shaking the Tree: Readings from Nature in the History of Life. Chicago, IL: University of Chicago Press. ISBN 978-0-226-28497-2. LCCN 99049796. OCLC 42476104.
- Gould, Stephen Jay (1989). Wonderful Life: The Burgess Shale and the Nature of History (1st ed.). New York: W. W. Norton & Company. Bibcode:1989wlbs.book.....G. ISBN 978-0-393-02705-1. LCCN 88037469. OCLC 18983518.
- Grimaldi, David; Engel, Michael S. (2005). Evolution of the Insects. Cambridge; New York: Cambridge University Press. ISBN 978-0-521-82149-0. LCCN 2004054605. OCLC 56057971.
- Hinde, Rosalind T. (2001). "The Cnidaria and Ctenophora". In Anderson, D. T. (ed.). Invertebrate Zoology (2nd ed.). Melbourne; New York: Oxford University Press. ISBN 978-0-19-551368-4. LCCN 2002276846. OCLC 49663129.
- Holmes, Randall K.; Jobling, Michael G. (1996). "Genetics". In Baron, Samuel (ed.). Medical Microbiology (4th ed.). Galveston, TX: University of Texas Medical Branch. Exchange of Genetic Information. ISBN 978-0-9631172-1-2. LCCN 95050499. OCLC 33838234. PMID 21413277. Archived from the original on 2022-04-03.
- Krumbein, Wolfgang E.; Brehm, Ulrike; Gerdes, Gisela; et al. (2003). "Biofilm, Biodictyon, Biomat Microbialites, Oolites, Stromatolites Geophysiology, Global Mechanism, Parahistology" ( (PDF)). In Krumbein, Wolfgang E.; Paterson, David M.; Zavarzin, Georgii A. (eds.). Fossil and Recent Biofilms: A Natural History of Life on Earth. Dordrecht, the Netherlands: Kluwer Academic Publishers. ISBN 978-1-4020-1597-7. LCCN 2003061870. OCLC 52901566. Archived from the original on 2007-01-06.
- Labandeira, Conrad C.; Eble, Gunther J. (1999). "The Fossil Record of Insect Diversity and Disparity" ( (PDF)). In Anderson, John M.; Thackeray, John Francis; et al. (eds.). Towards Gondwana Alive: Promoting biodiversity & stemming the Sixth Extinction. Pretoria: Gondwana Alive Society. ISBN 978-1-919795-43-0. LCCN 2001385090. OCLC 44822625. Archived from the original on 2016-04-12. "Preview booklet for 'Gondwana alive : biodiversity and the evolving terrestrial biosphere', book planned for September 2000, and associated projects."
- Leakey, Richard (1994). The Origin of Humankind. Science Masters Series. New York: Basic Books. ISBN 978-0-465-03135-1. LCCN 94003617. OCLC 30739453.
- Margulis, Lynn (1981). Symbiosis in Cell Evolution: Life and its Environment on the Early Earth. San Francisco, CA: W. H. Freeman and Company. ISBN 978-0-7167-1256-5. LCCN 80026695. OCLC 6982472.
- McKinney, Michael L. (1997). "How do rare species avoid extinction? A paleontological view". In Kunin, William E.; Gaston, Kevin J. (eds.). The Biology of Rarity: Causes and consequences of rare—common differences (1st ed.). London; New York: Chapman & Hall. ISBN 978-0-412-63380-5. LCCN 96071014. OCLC 36442106.
- Miller, G. Tyler; Spoolman, Scott E. (2012). Environmental Science (14th ed.). Belmont, CA: Brooks/Cole. ISBN 978-1-111-98893-7. LCCN 2011934330. OCLC 741539226.
- Newman, William L. (July 9, 2007). "Age of the Earth". Geologic Time. Reston, VA: Publications Services, USGS. OCLC 18792528. Archived from the original on 2005-12-23.
- O'Leary, Margaret R. (2008). Anaxagoras and the Origin of Panspermia Theory. Bloomington, IN: iUniverse. ISBN 978-0-595-49596-2. OCLC 757322661.
- Padian, Kevin (2004). "Basal Avialae". In Weishampel, David B.; Dodson, Peter; Osmólska, Halszka (eds.). The Dinosauria (2nd ed.). Berkeley: University of California Press. ISBN 978-0-520-24209-8. LCCN 2004049804. OCLC 55000644.
- Sansom, Ivan J.; Smith, Moya M.; Smith, M. Paul (2001). "The Ordovician radiation of vertebrates". In Ahlberg, Per Erik (ed.). Major Events in Early Vertebrate Evolution: Palaeontology, phylogeny, genetics and development. Systematics Association special volume series. Vol. 61. London; New York: Taylor & Francis. ISBN 978-0-415-23370-5. LCCN 00062919. OCLC 51667292.
- Starr, Cecie; Evers, Christine A.; Starr, Lisa (2007). Biology Today and Tomorrow with Physiology (2nd ed.). Southbank, Australia; Belmont, CA: Thomson Brooks/Cole. ISBN 978-0-495-01654-0. LCCN 2005936176. OCLC 68043255.
- Stearns, Beverly Peterson; Stearns, Stephen C. (1999). Watching, from the Edge of Extinction. New Haven, CT: Yale University Press. ISBN 978-0-300-08469-6. LCCN 98034087. OCLC 803522914.
- Thewissen, J. G. M.; Madar, S. I.; Hussain, S. T. (1996). Ambulocetus natans, an Eocene cetacean (Mammalia) from Pakistan. Courier Forschungsinstitut Senckenberg. Vol. 191. Frankfurt: Senckenbergische Naturforschende Gesellschaft. ISBN 978-3-929907-32-2. LCCN 97151576. OCLC 36463214.
- Weber, Bettina; Büdel, Burkhard; Belnap, Jayne, eds. (2016). Biological Soil Crusts: An Organizing Principle in Drylands. Ecological Studies (Analysis and Synthesis). Vol. 226. Springer International Publishing. ISBN 978-3-319-30212-6. LCCN 2016941282. OCLC 995222892.
