= Andrew Smith (palaeontologist) =

British palaeontologist

Andrew Smith FRS FRSE

Senior Research Scientist, Natural History Museum
- Incumbent
- Assumed office 1991

Personal details
- Born: Andrew Benjamin Smith; 6 February 1954 (age 72) Dunoon, Argyllshire, Scotland
- Occupation: Palaeontologist

Andrew Benjamin Smith (born 6 February 1954) is a British palaeontologist, known for his research on the palaeontology of echinoderms. His cladistic classification of the phylum Echinodermata has become standard.

== Education and career ==
Growing up in Stonehaven along the eastern coast of Scotland, Smith was inspired to collect fossils after watching an episode of the television programme Blue Peter on fossil collection. In 1968, when on holiday in Shetland, he collected a complete fossil of a Devonian fish (Dipterus valenciennesi)—the specimen was put on display at the Shetland Museum in Lerwick.

From 1973 to 1976, Smith studied geology at the University of Edinburgh, where he graduated with first class honours. In the summer of 1976, on the recommendation of palaeontologist Euan Clarkson, he received a Carnegie Award to study echinoid fossil distribution in the Aalenian (Inferior Oolite) of the Cheltenham region of Gloucestershire. In 1976, Smith matriculated as a graduate student in the biology department of the University of Exeter. In 1980, under the supervision of David Nichols (1930–2020), Smith received a Ph.D. Smith's Ph.D. thesis involved a breakthrough in echinoid functional morphology through his use of the scanning electron microscope combined with histological preparations and some in vivo research. He also published multiple papers regarding the links between echinoid skeletal histology and soft-tissue anatomy. From 1980 to 1982, he worked at the University of Liverpool as a research assistant to palaeontolgist Christopher R. C. Paul. At the Natural History Museum, London, Smith was a scientific officer from 1982 to 2012, when he retired. During his 30 years of employment at the museum, he published numerous papers on the phylogeny, systematics, and taxonomy of echinoderms, gaining an international reputation as a leading expert on echinoderm palaeontology. In 1985, he participated in Western scientists' first geological traverse of the Tibetan plateau. Furthermore, alongside co-author Claud William Wright, Smith authored a twelve-part series of monographs on British echinoid fossils of the Cretaceous.

Smith's research also deals with methods of inferring patterns in evolutionary development from the fossil record. With biologist Colin Patterson, Smith pointed out possible pitfalls in interpreting the fossil record. Smith and colleagues assessed mass extinctions such as that at the Cretaceous/Tertiary transition from studies on spiny-shelled fossils. He conducted research on the earliest evolutionary origins of echinoderms and establishing the dates of the evolutionary origins of metazoan body morphologies. He also carried out comparative studies on evolution and species diversification using molecular biological methods and dealt with ancient DNA of fossil insects preserved in amber.

Along with his active research output, Smith designed and created a web-based, echinoid-specific approach to systematic zoology and paleontology named "The Echinoid Directory," which was sponsored by the Natural History Museum, London. The website was driven by the international community of echinoid scientists who contributed via a web interface. There were over 2,000 species pages and over 10,000 specimen illustrations. As of February 2025, the website is no longer functional and has been taken offline.

== Awards and honours ==
The Linnean Society of London awarded Andrew B. Smith in 1993 the Linnean Society Bicentenary Medal and in 2005 the Zoology Medal. The Geological Society of London award him in 1995 the Bigsby Medal and in 2002 the Lyell Medal. Smith was elected in 1996 a Fellow of the Royal Society of Edinburgh and in 2002 a Fellow of the Royal Society. He received in 2004 the Palaeontological Association's Golden Trilobite Award (for best website) and in 2020 the association's Lapworth Medal. In 2005 he was elected a corresponding member of the Paläontologische Gesellschaft.

== Selected publications ==
=== Journal articles ===
- Patterson, Colin; Smith, Andrew B. (1987). "Is the periodicity of extinctions a taxonomic artefact?". Nature. 330 (6145): 248–251. Bibcode:1987Natur.330..248P. doi:10.1038/330248a0.
- Rosen, Brian R.; Smith, Andrew B. (1988). "Tectonics from fossils? Analysis of reef-coral and sea-urchin distributions from late Cretaceous to Recent, using a new method". Geological Society, London, Special Publications. 37 (1): 275–306. Bibcode:1988GSLSP..37..275R. doi:10.1144/GSL.SP.1988.037.01.19.
- Smith, A. B. (1988). "Late Palaeozoic biogeography of East Asia and palaeontological constraints on plate tectonic reconstructions". Philosophical Transactions of the Royal Society of London. Series A, Mathematical and Physical Sciences. 326 (1589): 189–227. Bibcode:1988RSPTA.326..189S. doi:10.1098/rsta.1988.0085.
- Smith, Andrew B.; Littlewood, D. T. J. (1994). "Paleontological data and molecular phylogenetic analysis". Paleobiology. 20 (3): 259–273. Bibcode:1994Pbio...20..259S. doi:10.1017/S009483730001277X.
- Smith, Andrew B.; Jeffery, Charlotte H. (1998). "Selectivity of extinction among sea urchins at the end of the Cretaceous period". Nature. 392 (6671): 69–71. Bibcode:1998Natur.392...69S. doi:10.1038/32155.
- Smith, Andrew B. (2000). "Stratigraphy in Phylogeny Reconstruction". Journal of Paleontology. 74 (5): 763. Bibcode:2000JPal...74..763S. doi:10.1666/0022-3360(2000)074<0763:SIPR>2.0.CO;2. ISSN 0022-3360.
- Smith, Andrew B.; Gale, Andrew S.; Monks, Neale E. A. (2001). "Sea-Level Change and Rock-Record Bias in the Cretaceous: A Problem for Extinction and Biodiversity Studies" (PDF). Paleobiology. 27 (2): 241–253. Bibcode:2001Pbio...27..241S. doi:10.1666/0094-8373(2001)027<0241:SLCARR>2.0.CO;2. JSTOR 2666072.
- Smith, Andrew B. (2001). "Large–scale heterogeneity of the fossil record: Implications for Phanerozoic biodiversity studies". Philosophical Transactions of the Royal Society of London. Series B: Biological Sciences. 356 (1407): 351–367. doi:10.1098/rstb.2000.0768. PMC 1088432. PMID 11316484.
- Smith, Andrew. B.; Gale, Andrew. S.; Monks, Neale E. A. (2001). "Sea-level change and rock-record bias in the Cretaceous: A problem for extinction and biodiversity studies" (PDF). Paleobiology. 27 (2): 241. Bibcode:2001Pbio...27..241S. doi:10.1666/0094-8373(2001)027<0241:SLCARR>2.0.CO;2. ISSN 0094-8373.
- Park, Lisa; Smith, Andrew. B. (2001). "Beyond Phylogeny Reconstruction—Tree-Based Analyses in Paleontology: Foreword". Paleobiology. 27 (2): 187. Bibcode:2001Pbio...27..187P. doi:10.1666/0094-8373(2001)027<0187:BPRTBA>2.0.CO;2. ISSN 0094-8373.
- Forey, Peter L.; Fortey, Richard A.; Kenrick, Paul; Smith, Andrew B. (2004). "Taxonomy and fossils: A critical appraisal". Philosophical Transactions of the Royal Society of London. Series B: Biological Sciences. 359 (1444): 639–653. doi:10.1098/rstb.2003.1453. PMC 1693348. PMID 15253350.
- Smith, Andrew B.; Pisani, Davide; Mackenzie-Dodds, Jacqueline A.; Stockley, Bruce; Webster, Bonnie L.; Littlewood, D. Timothy J. (2006). "Testing the Molecular Clock: Molecular and Paleontological Estimates of Divergence Times in the Echinoidea (Echinodermata)". Molecular Biology and Evolution. 23 (10): 1832–1851. doi:10.1093/molbev/msl039. PMID 16777927.
- Smith, Andrew B. (2007). "Intrinsic versus extrinsic biases in the fossil record: Contrasting the fossil record of echinoids in the Triassic and early Jurassic using sampling data, phylogenetic analysis, and molecular clocks". Paleobiology. 33 (2): 310–323. Bibcode:2007Pbio...33..310S. doi:10.1666/06073.1.
- Smith, Andrew B. (2007). "Marine diversity through the Phanerozoic: Problems and prospects". Journal of the Geological Society. 164 (4): 731–745. Bibcode:2007JGSoc.164..731S. doi:10.1144/0016/76492006-184.
- Smith, Andrew B.; McGowan, Alistair J. (2007). "The Shape of the Phanerozoic Marine Palaeodiversity Curve: How Much Can be Predicted from the Sedimentary Rock Record of Western Europe?". Palaeontology. 50 (4): 765–774. Bibcode:2007Palgy..50..765S. doi:10.1111/j.1475-4983.2007.00693.x.
- Swalla, Billie J.; Smith, Andrew B. (2008). "Deciphering deuterostome phylogeny: Molecular, morphological and palaeontological perspectives". Philosophical Transactions of the Royal Society B: Biological Sciences. 363 (1496): 1557–1568. doi:10.1098/rstb.2007.2246. PMC 2615822. PMID 18192178.
- Kroh, Andreas; Smith, Andrew B. (2010). "The phylogeny and classification of post-Palaeozoic echinoids". Journal of Systematic Palaeontology. 8 (2): 147–212. Bibcode:2010JSPal...8..147K. doi:10.1080/14772011003603556.
- Smith, Andrew B.; Crame, J. Alistair (2012). "Echinoderm faunas from the Lower Cretaceous (Aptian–Albian) of Alexander Island, Antarctica". Palaeontology. 55 (2): 305–324. Bibcode:2012Palgy..55..305S. doi:10.1111/j.1475-4983.2012.01129.x.
- Smith, Andrew B.; Benson, Roger B.J. (2013). "Marine diversity in the geological record and its relationship to surviving bedrock area, lithofacies diversity, and original marine shelf area". Geology. 41 (2): 171–174. Bibcode:2013Geo....41..171S. doi:10.1130/G33773.1.
- Smith, Andrew B. (2013). "Geological history of bathyal echinoid faunas, with a new genus from the late Cretaceous of Italy". Geological Magazine. 150 (1): 177–182. Bibcode:2013GeoM..150..177S. doi:10.1017/S0016756812000738.

=== Book chapters ===
- Murray, John William, ed. (1985). "Echinodermata by Andrew B. Smith". Atlas of Invertebrate Macrofossils. London: Longman. pp. 153–181. ISBN 0582300991.
- Briggs, Derek E. G.; Crowther, Peter R., eds. (1989). "Analysis of diversity by A. B. Smith". Paleobiology. A synthesis. Blackwell Scientific Publications.
  - Briggs, Derek E. G.; Crowther, Peter R., eds. (15 April 2008). "Analysis of diversity by A. B. Smith". Palaeobiology II. John Wiley & Sons. pp. 504–509. ISBN 978-0-470-99928-8.
- Whybrow, P. J., ed. (2000). "Chapter one. Across Tibet by jeep, pony and foot by Andrew Smith, FRSE". Travels with the Fossil Hunters. Cambridge University Press. pp. 1–22. ISBN 0-521-66301-6.
- Cracraft, Joel; Donoghue, Michael J., eds. (2004). "Chapter 22. From bilateral symmetry to pentaradiality: The phylogeny of hemichordates and echinoderms by Andrew B. Smith, Kevin J. Peterson, Gregory Wray, and D. T. J. Littlewood". Assembling the Tree of Life. Oxford University Press. pp. 365–383. ISBN 978-0-19-972960-9.
- Selley, R.C.; Cocks, L.R.M.; Plimer, I.R., eds. (2005). "Echinoderms (other than echinoids) by A. B. Smith". Encyclopedia of Geology. Vol. 2. pp. 334–341. (Section: Fossil Invertebrates)

=== Books and monographs ===
- Smith, Andrew B. (1980). Stereom Microstructure of the Echinoid Test (PDF). Special Papers in Palaeontology, No. 25. Palaeontological Association. ISBN 978-0-901702-86-9. (The hard shell of an echinoid is called a "test".)
- Smith, Andrew B. (January 1984). Echinoid Palaeobiology. Allen & Unwin. ISBN 978-0-04-563001-1.
- Smith, Andrew B., ed. (1985). Fossils of the Chalk. Field guides to fossils, no. 2 (1st ed.). London: Palaeontological Association; compiled by Owen Ellis
  - Smith, Andrew B.; Batten, David J., eds. (2002). revised & enlarged 2nd edition. Wiley. ISBN 0901702781; viii+374 pages, illustrations, maps
- Paul, C. R. C.; Smith, A. B., eds. (1988). Echinoderm phylogeny and evolutionary biology. published for the Liverpool Geological Society by Clarendon Press, Oxford University Press. ISBN 019854491X; 373 pages; a selection of presentations given at a symposium held in London in December 1986
- Smith, Andrew B. (1994). Systematics and the fossil record: documenting evolutionary patterns. Oxford; Cambridge (Massachusetts): Blackwell Science.
  - pbk reprint. John Wiley & Sons. 2009. ISBN 978-1-4443-1390-1.
- Emson, Roland; Smith, Andrew; Campbell, Andrew, eds. (June 1995). Echinoderm Research 1995. CRC Press. ISBN 978-90-5410-596-1.
- Skelton, Peter; Smith, Andrew; Monks, Neale (19 September 2002). Cladistics: A Practical Primer on CD-ROM. Cambridge University Press. ISBN 978-0-521-52341-7. 2002
