= Anthony Hallam =

British geologist, palaeontologist and writer (1933–2017)

- Born: 23 December 1933; Leicester, UK
- Died: 23 October 2017 (aged 83); Birmingham, England
- Education: University of Cambridge
- Known for: Geology of the Jurassic
- Awards: 1990 Lyell Medal of the Geological Society of London; Lapworth Medal of the Palaeontological Association; Leopold-von-Buch-Plakette, German Geological Society
- Scientific career
- Fields: Palaeontology and stratigraphy
- Workplaces: University of Birmingham
- Doctoral advisor: William Joscelyn Arkell

Anthony Hallam, aka Tony Hallam, (23 December 1933 – 23 October 2017) was a British geologist, palaeontologist and writer. His research interests concentrated on the Jurassic Period, with particular reference to stratigraphy, sea level changes and palaeontology. He was also interested in mass extinctions, especially the end Triassic event.

== Biography ==
Born in Leicester and having attended local schools, Hallam won an exhibition to St John's College, Cambridge, graduating with a double first class degree in geology in 1955. He remained at Cambridge University as researcher under the supervision of the late William Joscelyn Arkell, widely regarded as the expert on the Jurassic Period at that time. His thesis involved the study of the alternating limestone – shale rhythms of the Lower Jurassic of Southern England. He also published work on the evolution of Gryphaea, an extinct species of oyster. He was awarded a PhD in 1959 for a thesis entitled "Stratigraphical studies in some Liassic rocks".

Following a period as lecturer at the University of Edinburgh (1958–67), Hallam moved to the University of Oxford as lecturer in geology. He was also a Fellow of New College, Oxford. It was during this time that he continued his research into the controversial evolution of Gryphaea, publishing several papers with the late Stephen Jay Gould.

Hallam was appointed Lapworth Professor of geology at the University of Birmingham in 1977. This prestigious chair was named in honour of Charles Lapworth, the first Professor of geology at that university. Following retirement in 1999, Hallam remained at Birmingham University as professor emeritus.

He directly supervised over 35 graduate research students, including Bruce Sellwood (1967–70) and Geoff Townson (1968–71).

== Publications ==
He has written over 200 research papers and is the author or editor of more than twelve books, including Jurassic Environments, Great Geological Controversies and Catastrophes and Lesser Calamities: The Causes of Mass Extinctions.

- Phanerozoic sea-level changes, (Columbia University Press 1992) ISBN 978-0-231-07424-7

== Awards ==
He was awarded the Lyell Medal by the Geological Society of London in 1990. In 2007, he was awarded the Lapworth Medal, by the Palaeontological Association, that Society's highest award.

== Personal life ==
Hallam was a very active researcher, undertaking field trips and attending conferences well into retirement. In his spare time he enjoyed watching football, the arts, cinema and travel.
