= William Gilbert Chaloner =

British paleobotanist (1928–2016)

Bill Chaloner
- Born: William Gilbert Chaloner; 22 November 1928
- Died: 13 October 2016 (aged 87)
- Awards: FRS; Lapworth Medal (2005)
- Scientific career
- Institutions: Royal Holloway, University of London; University College, London
- Thesis: The spores of the Carboniferous lycopods (1953)
- Doctoral advisor: Tom Harris

William Gilbert Chaloner FRS (22 November 1928 – 13 October 2016) was a British palaeobotanist. He was Professor of Botany in the Earth Sciences Department at Royal Holloway, University of London, and visiting professor in Earth Sciences at University College, London.

== Education and early life ==
Chaloner was born in Chelsea, the son of Ernest J and Lenore (née Maude) Chaloner and was educated at Kingston Grammar School. He attended evening classes in Geology at Chelsea Polytechnic. In 1947 he went to study Botany, Geology and Chemistry at the University of Reading and was awarded a first class Bachelor of Science degree in 1950 followed by a Ph.D. in 1953 under the supervision of Tom Harris.

== Career ==
After a postdoctoral year at the University of Michigan, he returned home to serve two years National Service in the army before joining the Department of Botany at University College, University of London in 1956. In 1972 he became Professor of Botany at Birkbeck College, University of London. In 1979 he was appointed to the Hildred Carlyle Chair of Botany at Bedford College. He has held visiting professorships at Pennsylvania State University, University of Nigeria, Nsukka and the University of Massachusetts Amherst.

== Awards and honours ==
Chaloner was an elected Fellow of the Royal Society in 1976, the Linnean Society and the recipient of several awards, including the Linnean Medal and the Palaeontological Association's Lapworth Medal. He was elected as a Trustee for the Royal Botanical Gardens at Kew in 1983. He was president of the Linnean Society from 1985 to 1988.

== Personal life ==
Chaloner was married to Judith Carroll, an American in 1955, with whom he had three children. Chaloner died on 13 October 2016 at the age of 87.
