= Robin Cocks =

British geologist (1938–2023)

Robin Cocks OBE TD
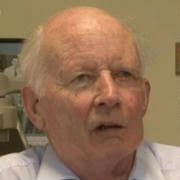
- Born: 17 June 1938
- Died: 5 February 2023 (aged 84)
- Education: Hertford College, Oxford (MA, DPhil, DSc
- Awards: Coke Medal, Geological Society of London (1995); Lapworth Medal (2010); OBE (1999); TD (1979)
- Scientific career
- Workplaces: Natural History Museum, London
- Thesis: Upper Llandovery brachiopods from Shropshire
- Doctoral advisor: Stuart McKerrow

Leonard Robert Morrison Cocks, OBE, TD (17 June 1938 – 5 February 2023), known as Robin Cocks, was a British geologist, formerly Keeper of Palaeontology, Natural History Museum. He was best known for his work on brachiopods, and their use in reconstructing Earth history and past ecosystems.

== Biography ==
Cocks was born in 1938; the son of Ralph Morrison Cocks and Lucille Mary Blackler. He was educated at Felsted School and Hertford College, Oxford. He was commissioned into the Royal Artillery in 1958, and saw military service in Malaya from 1958-1959. After leaving the army, Cocks went up to Hertford College, Oxford in 1959 to read for a bachelor's degree in geology. He subsequently became a research student at Oxford in 1962, funded by the DSIR, and completed his doctoral thesis on Silurian brachiopods from Shropshire in 1965.

== Career ==
Cocks joined the staff of the Natural History Museum, London as Scientific Officer in the department of palaeontology in September 1965. He was promoted to Senior Scientific Officer the next year, and to Principal Scientific Officer in June 1972. Cocks was appointed to Deputy Keeper in 1982, and was Keeper of Palaeontology from 1986 until retirement in June 1998. From 1970 to 1983 he served as a geologist with the Royal Engineers. He served as president of the Geological Society (1998-2000), Palaeontological Association (1994-1998), Palaeontographical Society (1994-1998) and Geologists' Association (2004-2006). He also served on national and international scientific committees, including the International Commission on Zoological Nomenclature (1982-2000). Cocks published many papers and books during his career, including The Evolving Earth (1981), and Earth History and Palaoegeography, with Trond Torsvik in 2016. In 2019, Cocks published a monograph on Llandovery brachiopods, synthesising much of his taxonomic work of the previous six decades.

== Personal life and death ==
In 1963, Cocks married Elaine Margaret Sturdy; they had three children, Mark, Zoe and Julia. Cocks died on 5 February 2023, at the age of 84.

== Awards ==
Cocks was awarded the Coke Medal of the Geological Society of London in 1995; the Andre Dumont Medal of the Belgian Geological Society (Geologica Belgica) in 2003, and in 2010 he was awarded the Palaeontological Association's Lapworth Medal. He was appointed an Officer of the Order of the British Empire (OBE) in the 1999 New Year Honours for services to palaeontology.
