= Lapworth Medal =

Highest award of the Palaeontological Association

The Lapworth Medal is the highest award of the Palaeontological Association, given to those who have made a significant contribution to the science by means of a substantial body of research.

== Recipients ==
Source: Palaeontological Association

- 2024 - Prof. Michael J. Benton, OBE, FRS
- 2023 - Prof. Else Marie Friis
- 2022 - Prof. Moya Meredith Smith
- 2021 - Dr Angela C. Milner
- 2020 - Prof. Andrew B. Smith FRS
- 2019 - Prof. Derek E.G. Briggs, FRS
- 2018 - Prof. Derek J. Siveter
- 2017 - Prof. Stefan Bengtson
- 2016 - Dr Adrian William Amsler Rushton
- 2015 - Prof. Jennifer Clack FRS
- 2014 - Prof. Richard A. Fortey, FRS
- 2013 - Prof. Dianne Edwards, FRS
- 2012 - Prof. Euan Clarkson
- 2011 - Prof. Richard Aldridge
- 2010 - Dr Robin Cocks
- 2009 - Prof. Bruce Runnegar
- 2008 - Prof. Charles Holland
- 2007 - Prof. Tony Hallam
- 2006 - Prof. Dolf Seilacher
- 2005 - Prof. William Chaloner FRS
- 2004 - Prof. James Valentine
- 2002 - Prof. Sir Alwyn Williams FRS
- 2000 - Prof. Harry B. Whittington FRS

== See also ==
- List of paleontology awards
