= Keeper of Palaeontology, Natural History Museum =

Academic position at NHM, London

The Keeper of Palaeontology was formerly a palaeontological academic position at the Natural History Museum, London. The Keeper of Palaeontology served as the Head of the Department of Palaeontology: following reorganisation in 2013 the Departments of Mineralogy and Palaeontology merged to become the Earth Sciences department.

Between 1813 and 1956 the department was known as the Department of Geology, and the head of the department as the Keeper of Geology.

== Keepers of Geology ==
- Charles Dietrich Eberhard Konig 1813–1851
- George Robert Waterhouse 1851–1880
- Henry Woodward 1880–1901
- Arthur Smith Woodward 1901–1924
- Francis Arthur Bather 1924–1928
- William Dickson Lang 1928–1938
- Wilfred Norman Edwards 1938–1955
- Errol Ivor White 1955–1956

== Keepers of Palaeontology ==
- Errol Ivor White 1956–1966
- Harold William Ball 1966–1986
- Leonard Robert Morrison Cocks 1986–1998
- Stephen Kenneth Donovan 1998–2002
- Norman MacLeod 2002–2013
