= Bridget Wade =

British palaeontologist

- Education: University of Edinburgh; University of Leeds
- Scientific career
- Workplaces: Texas A&M University; University College London
- Thesis: High-resolution stable isotope records as indicators of late middle eocene climate change (2002)

Bridget S. Wade is a British micropalaeontologist who is a professor at the University College London. Her research considers Cenozoic climate change, which she investigates by studying preserved planktonic foraminifera. Wade was a guest on the 2020 Royal Institution Christmas Lectures.

== Early life and education ==
Wade was an undergraduate student at the University of Leeds. She did an MSc in Micropalaeontology at UCL. She moved to the University of Edinburgh for her graduate studies where she studied stable isotope records as a means to understand Eocene climate change.

== Research and career ==
After earning her doctorate, Wade was awarded a Natural Environment Research Council (NERC) postdoctoral fellowship. Wade continued her scientific career in the United States, first at Rutgers University as a Lindemann Research Fellow and then as an Assistant and Associate Professor at Texas A&M University.

Wade has taken part in the Ocean Drilling Program, Integrated Ocean Drilling Program, International Continental Scientific Drilling Program and the Tanzania Drilling Project. This research resulted in Wade making contributions to the field of palaeontology, including identifying that before the extinction of Eocene planktonic foraminifera there was an increase in the production of surface water, which triggered the loss of algal photosymbionts. She created a high-resolution astrochronological framework to allow for the characterisation of fluctuations in ice volume (including their magnitude and frequency) and evaluation of their impact on the global carbon cycle.

In 2013 Wade joined University College London as a Professor of Micropalaeontology.

== Awards and honours ==
- 2005 Elected Chair of the International Commission on Stratigraphy Paleogene Planktonic Foraminifera Working Group
- 2008 Palaeontological Association Hodson Award
- 2009 National Science Foundation CAREER Award
- 2011 Micropalaeontological Society Alan Higgins Award
- Elected Fellow of the Paleontology Society
- 2012 The Geological Society Wollaston Fund
- 2013 Paleontology Society Charles Schuchert Award
- 2016 European Consortium for Ocean Research Drilling Distinguished Lecturer
- 2020 Guest presenter on the Royal Institution Christmas Lectures
- 2020 Bigsby Medal

== Selected publications ==
- Wade, Bridget S.; Pearson, Paul N.; Berggren, William A.; Pälike, Heiko (January 2011). "Review and revision of Cenozoic tropical planktonic foraminiferal biostratigraphy and calibration to the geomagnetic polarity and astronomical time scale". Earth-Science Reviews. 104 (1–3): 111–142. Bibcode:2011ESRv..104..111W. doi:10.1016/j.earscirev.2010.09.003. hdl:1912/4398. ISSN 0012-8252.
- Atlas of oligocene planktonic foraminifera. Wade, Bridget S., Olsson, Richard K., Pearson, Paul N., Huber, Brian T., Berggren, William A. [Lawrence, KS]. 2018. ISBN 978-1-970168-41-9. OCLC 1181957160.
