= M. Paul Smith =

Paul Smith
- Born: England
- Education: University of Nottingham; University of Leicester
- Scientific career
- Fields: Palaeontology
- Workplaces: University of Birmingham
- Doctoral advisor: Richard Aldridge
- Doctoral students: Ivan Sansom
- Website: https://www.oumnh.ox.ac.uk/people/paul-smith

M. Paul Smith is a British palaeontologist, head of the Oxford University Museum of Natural History and professor in Kellogg College. Previously he was Professor of Palaeobiology at the University of Birmingham, head of the university's School of Geography, Earth and Environmental Sciences, and Director of its Lapworth Museum of Geology. He received his BSc from the University of Leicester and his PhD from the University of Nottingham.

Smith's research primarily has focused on the conodont palaeobiology and the early Palaeozoic radiation of vertebrates. He is known for discovering that conodont teeth were made of bone cells, such as are found only in vertebrates. This dated the origin of the vertebrates to 515 million years before the present, 40 million years earlier than had been previously thought.

He was also involved in the geological mapping of northeastern Greenland.

He is Chair of the Publications Board of The Palaeontological Association, and joint editor of the Systematics Association special volume, Donoghue, Philip C. J., and M. Paul Smith. Telling the Evolutionary Time: Molecular Clocks and the Fossil Record. Boca Raton: CRC Press, 2004. ISBN 978-0-415-27524-8.

== Publications ==
Books

- Philip C. J. Donoghue, M. Paul Smith. Telling the evolutionary time: Molecular Clocks and the Fossil Record. CRC Press, 2004.
- A. K. Higgins, Jane A. Gilotti, M. Paul Smith. The Greenland Caledonides: Evolution of the Northeast Margin of Laurentia, Geological Society of America, 2008.

Select peer-reviewed journal articles

- Sansom, I. J., Smith, M. P., Armstrong, H. A. and Smith, M. M. 1992. "Presence of the earliest vertebrate hard tissues in conodonts." Science 256: 1308–1311. Cited 60 times according to Scopus.
- Sansom, I. J., Smith, M. P. and Smith, M. M. 1994. "Dentine in conodonts." Nature 368: 591. Cited 30 times in Scopus.
- Sansom, I. J., Smith, M. P. and Smith, M. M. 1996. "Scales of thelodont and shark-like fishes from the Ordovician." Nature 379: 628–630.Cited 543 times according to Scopus/
- Smith, M. P., Sansom, I. J. and Repetski, J. E. 1996. "Histology of the first fish." Nature 380: 702–704. Cited 26 times according to Scopus 729–730.
- Thomas, A.T., Smith, M.P. 1998 "Terebellid polychaete burrows from the lower Palaeozoic" Palaeontology 41 (2), pp. 317–333 Cited 7 times according to Scopus
- Donoghue, P.C.J., Smith, M.P. 2001 "The anatomy of Turinia pagei (Powrie), and the phylogenetic status of the Thelodonti" Transactions of the Royal Society of Edinburgh, Earth Sciences 92 (1), pp. 15–37. Cited 35 times according to Scopus
