= Emily Rayfield =

British palaeontologist

- Born: Northallerton
- Education: Oxford University; Cambridge University
- Awards: Hodson Award of the Palaeontological Association; Lyell Fund of the Geological Society of London; President, Society of Vertebrate Paleontology 2018-2020
- Scientific career
- Fields: Palaeontology
- Workplaces: University of Bristol
- Doctoral advisor: David B. Norman

Emily Rayfield is a British palaeontologist, who is a Professor in Palaeobiology in the School of Earth Sciences at the University of Bristol.

Her research focuses on the functional anatomy of extinct vertebrates, especially dinosaurs, using computational methods such as finite element analysis (FEA). In the landmark paper Rayfield et al. (2001), the skull of the theropod dinosaur Allosaurus was analysed using FEA in order to quantitatively assess different feeding hypotheses. This paper was the first use of FEA on a three-dimensional structure in palaeontology (in collaboration with CT scanning), and spurred interest in using CT-scanned skull FEA on feeding biomechanics in zoology and palaeontology.

In addition, she helped elucidate the cranial biomechanics of the noted carnivorous dinosaur Tyrannosaurus using two-dimensional FEA. This study was expanded upon in a comparative finite element analysis of 2D theropod skulls (namely Allosaurus Coelophysis and Tyrannosaurus), in order to quantitatively compare cranial biomechanics.

She was President of the Society of Vertebrate Paleontology from 2018 to 2020.

== Honours and awards ==
- 2009 Hodson Award from the Palaeontological Association
- 2011 Lyell Fund of the Geological Society of London
- 2018 President's Medal from the Palaeontological Association
- 2019 Bigsby Medal from the Geological Society of London
- 2019 Scientific Medal from the Zoological Society of London
- 2024 Gabor Medal from the Royal Society
