= Ivan Sansom =

Welsh paleontologist

- Born: Prestatyn, Wales
- Education: University of Durham; University of Aston
- Awards: Hodson Fund of the Palaeontological Association
- Scientific career
- Fields: Palaeontology
- Workplaces: University of Birmingham
- Doctoral advisor: Howard Armstrong and M. Paul Smith

Ivan Sansom (born Prestatyn) is a British palaeontologist, Senior Lecturer in Palaeobiology at the University of Birmingham. His research has focused primarily on the conodont palaeobiology and the early Palaeozoic radiation of vertebrates.

Sansom is an editor of the Journal of the Geological Society.

In 2001 Sansom was a recipient of the Palaeontological Association's Hodson Award, conferred on palaeontologists who have made a notable early contribution to the science.

== Selected publications ==
- Sansom, I. J., Smith, M. P., Armstrong, H. A. and Smith, M. M. 1992. Presence of the earliest vertebrate hard tissues in conodonts. Science 256: 1308-1311.]
- Sansom, I. J., Smith, M. P. and Smith, M. M. 1994. Dentine in conodonts. Nature 368: 591.
- Sansom, I. J., Smith, M. P. and Smith, M. M. 1996. Scales of thelodont and shark-like fishes from the Ordovician. Nature 379: 628-630.
- Smith, M. P., Sansom, I. J. and Repetski, J. E. 1996. Histology of the first fish. Nature 380: 702-704.
- Coates, M. I., Sequeira, S. E. K., Sansom, I. J. and Smith, M. M. 1998. Spines and tissues of ancient sharks. Nature 396: 729-730.
- Sansom, I. J., Donoghue, P. C. J. and Albanesi, G. L. 2005. Histology and affinity of the earliest armoured vertebrate. Biology Letters 2: 446-449.
