= Christopher Wills =

Professor Emeritus of Biology at UCSD

Christopher J. Wills (born 1938) is Professor Emeritus of Biology at UCSD.

He received his Ph.D. from UC Berkeley. As a Guggenheim Fellow, he worked at the Karolinska Institute, Stockholm, on protein chemistry and evolution.

He is the author of The Runaway Brain: The Evolution of Human Uniqueness (1994), Children Of Prometheus, The Accelerating Pace Of Human Evolution (1999), The Spark Of Life: Darwin And The Primeval Soup (2001), and The Darwinian Tourist: Viewing the World Through Evolutionary Eyes (late 2010). Children of Prometheus was a finalist for the Aventis Prize in 2000. He received the 1998 Award for the Public Understanding of Science and Technology from the American Association for the Advancement of Science.

His book on Why Ecosystems Matter, Preserving the Key to Our Survival has been honored with the 2025 Marsh Book of the Year Award from the British Ecological Society.
