= Maria McNamara =

Irish palaeontologist

- Born: 2 June 1980 (age 46); Clonmel, Ireland
- Education: University College Dublin
- Known for: Research on fossil preservation
- Children: 2
- Awards: President's Prize (2003); President's Prize (2005); Hodson Award (2014); ERC Starting Grant (2014); ERC Consolidator Grant (2020)
- Scientific career
- Fields: Palaeontology
- Workplaces: University College Cork
- Thesis: Comparative taphonomy of lacustrine-hosted exceptional faunas from the Miocene of NE Spain (2007)
- Doctoral advisor: Patrick Orr
- Website: https://mariamcnamara.ucc.ie

Maria Eithne McNamara, MRIA, is an Irish palaeontologist. She is Professor of Palaeobiology at University College Cork.

McNamara's research focuses on the preservation of soft tissues in the fossil record, fossil colour, and feather evolution through the use of laboratory analytical techniques, including FTIR, Raman spectroscopy, SEM, TEM, synchrotron-XRF and XANES. Furthermore, controlled laboratory-based taphonomic experiments that simulate aspects of the fossilization process are done to illustrate how information on biological structures and chemistry is lost during decay and diagenesis, and help to predict what sort of information is likely to preserve in fossils.

== Life and work ==
McNamara obtained her undergraduate degree in Earth Sciences at the University of Galway in 2002. In 2007 she was awarded a PhD by University College Dublin (UCD) in 2007 with a thesis focusing on taphonomy. After a two year postdoc at UCD, McNamara spent a year as a geopark geologist at the Burren and Cliffs of Moher Geopark. She returned to academia in 2009 after being awarded a Marie Curie Postdoctoral Fellow at Yale University. In 2012 McNamara did further postdoctoral research on feather coloration at the University of Bristol, and in 2013 she was given the position of lecturer at University College Cork (UCC).

In 2016 McNamara was one of the eight women to be painted by Blaise Smith in honour of being the recipient of European Research Council Starter Grants. The painting was exhibited at the United Nations headquarters and is now on permanent exhibition at the Royal Irish Academy. McNamara became professor at UCC in 2020.

In 2020 McNamara became one of only a handful of Irish scientists to be awarded a second European Research Council grant, with the award of a European Research Council Consolidator Grant.

McNamara is strongly active in the area of public engagement of science and has hosted exhibits, science festivals, and conferences. She runs a major public engagement project focussed on the fossils of Ireland, called Ireland's Fossil Heritage, that has directly reached over 1000 schoolchildren, and over 30,000 members of the public, in Ireland. She has also appeared on RTE's documentary The Island.

In 2024 under the Science Foundation Ireland Discover programme, McNamara was one of the awardees and granted €300,000 to continue the expansion of Ireland's Fossil Heritage project.

She was made a member of the Royal Irish Academy in 2024.

== Accolades ==
- 2023: Research Team of the Year (University College Cork).
- 2019: Start-up Laboratory of the Year (Irish Lab Awards).
- 2017: Paleonturology Award (Fundacion Conjunto Paleontologico de Teruel – Dinopolis).
- 2014: Hodson Award (Palaeontological Association).
- 2014: Early Career Researcher of the Year (University College Cork).
- 2010: Best paper of 2009 for ‘Soft tissue preservation in Miocene frogs from Libros (Spain): Insights into the genesis of decay microenvironments.’ (Palaios)
- 2009: Charles Lyell Award for science communication (British Science Association).
- 2005: President’s Prize (Palaeontological Association).
- 2005: Best oral presentation (Irish Geological Research Meeting).
- 2003: President’s Prize (Palaeontological Association).

== Publications ==
=== Selected list ===
- McNamara, M.E., Roulin, A.L., Rossi, V., Rogers, C.S., Slater, T.S., Dubey, S., Roulin, A., 2021. Decoding the evolution of melanin in vertebrates. Trends in Ecology and Evolution 36, 430-443. DOI: https://doi.org/10.1016/j.tree.2020.12.012.
- McNamara, M.E., Briggs, D.E.G., Orr, P.J.O., Field, D., Wang, Z., 2013. Experimental maturation of feathers: implications for reconstructions of fossil feather colour. Biology Letters 9, 20130184. DOI: https://doi.org/10.1098/rsbl.2013.0184.
- McNamara, M.E., 2013. The taphonomy of colour in fossil insects and feathers. Palaeontology, 56, 557-575. DOI: https://doi.org/10.1111/pala.12044.
- McNamara, M.E., Briggs, D.E.G., Orr, P.J., Noh, H., Cao, H., 2012. The original colours of fossil beetles. Proceedings B 279, 1114 – 1121. DOI: https://doi.org/10.1098/rspb.2011.1677

=== Exhaustive list ===
- Slater, T.S., Edwards, N.P., Webb, S.M., Zhang, F., McNamara, M.E. 2023. Preservation of corneous beta proteins in Mesozoic feathers. Nature Ecology & Evolution. DOI: https://doi.org/10.1038/s41559-023-02177-8
- Wang, S., McNamara, M.E., Wang, B., Hui, H., Jiang, B., 2023. The origins of colour patterns in fossil insects revealed by maturation experiments. Proceedings B, 290, 20231333. DOI: https://doi.org/10.1098/rspb.2023.1333.
- Yang, Z., Jiang, B., Benton, M.J., Xu, X., McNamara, M.E., Hone, D.W.E., 2023. Allometric wing growth links parental care to pterosaur giantism. Proceedings B, 290, 20231102. DOI: https://doi.org/10.1098/rspb.2023.1102
- Binner, H., Sullivan, T., Jansen, M.A.K., McNamara, M.E., 2022. Metals in urban soils of Europe: A systematic review. Science of the Total Environment, 854, 158734. DOI: https://doi.org/10.1016/j.scitotenv.2022.158734.
- Falk, D., Wings, O., McNamara, M.E., 2022. The skeletal taphonomy of anurans from the Eocene Geiseltal Konservat-Lagerstätte, Germany: insights into the controls on fossil anuran preservation. Papers in Palaeontology, 8, e1453. DOI: https://doi.org/10.1002/spp2.1453.
- Rossi, V., Unitt, R., McNamara, M., Zorzin, R., Carnevale, G., 2022. Skin patterning and internal anatomy in a fossil moonfish from the Eocene Bolca Lagerstätte illuminate the ecology of ancient reef fish communities. Palaeontology, 65, e12600. DOI: https://doi.org/10.1111/pala.12600.
- Cincotta, A., Nicolaï, M., Nascimento Campos, H.B., McNamara, M., D’Alba, L., Shawkey, M.D., Kischlat, E.E., Yans, J., Carleer, R. Escuillié, F., Godefroit, P., 2022. Pterosaur melanosomes support signalling functions for early feathers. Nature, 604, 684-688. DOI: https://doi.org/10.1038/s41586-022-04622-3.
- Yang, Z., Benton, M.J., Hone, D.W.E., Xu, X., McNamara, M.E., Jiang, B., 2021. Allometric analysis sheds light on the systematics and ontogeny of anurognathid pterosaurs. Journal of Vertebrate Paleontology, e2028796. DOI: https://doi.org/10.1080/02724634.2021.2028796.
- Rossi, V., Webb, S., McNamara, M.E., 2021. Maturation experiments reveal bias in the chemistry of fossil melanosomes. Geology 49, 784 – 788. DOI: https://doi.org/10.1130/G48696.1.
- Zhang, Y., Shih, P., Wang, J., McNamara, M.E., Shih, C., Ren, D., Taiping, G., 2021. Jurassic scorpionflies (Mecoptera) with swollen first metatarsal segments suggesting sexual dimorphism. BMC Ecology and Evolution 21, 47. DOI: https://doi.org/10.1186/s12862-021-01771-3
- Rogers, C.S., Webb, S., McNamara, M.E., 2020. Synchrotron-X-ray fluorescence analysis reveals diagenetic alteration of fossil melanosome trace metal chemistry. Palaeontology 64, 63-73. DOI: https://doi.org/10.1111/pala.12506.
- Yang, Z., Jiang, B., McNamara, M.E., Kearns, S.L., Pittman, M., Kaye, T.G., Orr, P.J., Xu, X., Benton, M.J., 2020. Reply to: ‘No protofeathers on pterosaurs’. Nature Ecology and Evolution 4, 1592-1593. DOI: https://doi.org/10.1038/s41559-020-01309-8.
- Rossi, V., Webb, S., McNamara, M.E., 2020. Hierarchical biota-level and taxonomic controls on the chemistry of fossil melanosomes revealed using synchrotron X-ray fluorescence. Scientific Reports 10, 8970. DOI: https://doi.org/10.1038/s41598-020-65868-3.
- McDonald, L., Saranathan, V., Narayanan, S., Sandy, A., McNamara, M.E., 2020. Brilliant angle-independent structural colours preserved in weevil scales from the Swiss Pleistocene. Biology Letters 16, 20200063. DOI: https://doi.org/10.1098/rsbl.2020.0063.
- Tian, Q., Wang, S., Yang, Z., McNamara, M.E., Benton, M.J., Jiang, B., 2020. Experimental investigation of insect deposition in lentic environments and implications for formation of insect Konservat-Lagerstätten. Palaeontology 63, 565-578. DOI: https://doi.org/10.1111/pala.12472.
- Rogers, C.S., Astrop, T.I.A., McNamara, M.E., Webb, S., Ito, S., Wakamatsu, K., 2019. Synchrotron-X-ray absorption spectroscopy of melanosomes in vertebrates and cephalopods: implications for the affinity of Tullimonstrum. Proceedings B 286, 20191649. DOI: https://doi.org/10.1098/rspb.2019.1649.
- Slater, T.S., McNamara, M.E., Orr, P.J., Foley, T.B., Ito, S., Wakamatsu, K., 2019. Taphonomic experiments reveal controls on preservation of melanosomes and keratinous tissues in feathers. Palaeontology 63, 103-115. DOI: https://doi.org/10.1111/pala.12445.
- Rossi, V., McNamara, M.E., Webb, S., Ito, S., Wakamatsu, K., 2019. Tissue-specific geometry and chemistry of modern and fossilized melanosomes reveal internal anatomy of extinct vertebrates. PNAS 116, 17880-17889. DOI: https://doi.org/10.1073/pnas.1820285116.
- Benton, M.J., Dhouailly, D., Jiang, B., McNamara, M., 2019. The early origin of feathers. Trends in Ecology and Evolution 34, 856-869. DOI: https://doi.org/10.1016/j.tree.2019.04.018.
- Yang, Z.X., Jiang, B.Y., McNamara, M.E., Kearns, S.L., Pittman, M., Kaye, T.G., Orr, P.J., Xu, X., * Benton, M.J., 2019. Pterosaur integumentary structures with complex feather-like branching. Nature Ecology and Evolution 3, 24-30. DOI: https://doi.org/10.1038/s41559-018-0728-7.
- Yang, Z., Wang, S., Tian, Q., Wang, B., Hethke, M., McNamara, M.E., Benton, M.J., Xu, X., Jiang, B., 2019. Palaeoenvironmental reconstruction and biostratinomic analysis of the Jurassic Yanliao Lagerstätte in northeastern China. Palaeogeography, Palaeoclimatology, Palaeoecology 514, 739-753. DOI: https://doi.org/10.1016/j.palaeo.2018.09.030.
- Odin, G., McNamara, M.E., Arwin, H., Järrendhal, K., 2018. Experimental degradation of helicoidal photonic nanostructures in scarab beetles (Coleoptera: Scarabaeidae): implications for the identification of circularly polarizing cuticle in the fossil record. Journal of The Royal Society Interface 15, 20180560. DOI: https://doi.org/10.1098/rsif.2018.0560.
- McNamara, M.E., Zhang, F., Kearns, S.L., Orr, P.J., Toulouse, A., Foley, T., Hone, D.W.E., Rogers, C.S., Benton, M.J., Johnson, D., Xu, X., Zhou, Z., 2018. Fossilized skin reveals coevolution of skin, feathers and metabolism in feathered dinosaurs and early birds. Nature Communications 9, 2072. DOI: https://doi.org/10.1038/s41467-018-04443-x.
- McNamara, M.E., Kaye, J.S., Benton, M.J., Orr, P.J., Rossi, V., Ito, S., Wakamatsu, K., 2018. Non-integumentary melanosomes bias reconstructions of the colours of fossil vertebrate skin. Nature Communications, 9, 2878. DOI: https://doi.org/10.1038/s41467-018-05148-x.
- Zhang, Q., Mey, W., Ansorge, J., Starkey, T.A., McDonald, L.T., McNamara, M.E., et al., 2018. Fossil scales illuminate the early evolution of lepidopterans and structural colors. Science Advances 4, e1700988. DOI: https://doi.org/10.1126/sciadv.1700988.
- Purnell, M.A., Donoghue, P.J.C., Gabbott, S.E., McNamara, M.E., Murdock, D.J.E., Sansom, R.S., 2018. Experimental analysis of soft-tissue fossilization – opening the black box. Palaeontology 61, 317-323. DOI: https://doi.org/10.1111/pala.12360.
- Muscente, A.D., Schiffbauer, J.D., Broce, J., Laflamme, M., O’Donnell, K., Boag, T.H., Meyer, M., Hawkds, A.D., Warren Huntley, J.W., McNamara, M.E., et al., 2017. Exceptionally preserved fossil assemblages through geologic time and space. Gondwana Research 48, 164-188. DOI: https://doi.org/10.1016/j.gr.2017.04.020.
- Orr, P.J., Adler, L.B., Beardmore, S.R., Furrer, H., McNamara, M.E., Peñalver-Mollá, E., Redelstorff, R., 2016. Stick ‘n’ peel”: explaining unusual patterns of disarticulation and loss of completeness in fossil vertebrates. Palaeogeography, Palaeoclimatology, Palaeoecology 457, 380-388. DOI: https://doi.org/10.1016/j.palaeo.2016.05.024.
- McNamara, M.E., Orr, P.J., Kearns, S., Alcalá, L., Anadón, P., Peñalver, E., 2016. Reconstructing carotenoid-based and structural coloration in fossil skin. Current Biology 26, 1075-1082. DOI: https://doi.org/10.1016/j.cub.2016.02.038.
- McNamara, M.E., van Dongen, B.E., Lockyer, N.P., Bull, I.D., Orr, P.J., 2016. Fossilization of melanosomes via sulfurization. Palaeontology 59, 337-350. DOI: https://doi.org/10.1111/pala.12238.
- Rogers, C.S., Hone, D.W., McNamara, M.E., Zhao, Q., Orr, P.J., Kearns, S.K., Benton, M.J., 2015. The Chinese Pompeii? Death and destruction of dinosaurs in the Early Cretaceous of Lujiatun, NE China. Palaeogeography, Palaeoclimatology, Palaeoecology 427, 89-99. DOI: https://doi.org/10.1016/j.palaeo.2015.03.037.
- McNamara, M.E., Saranathan, V., Locatelli, E.R., Noh, H., Briggs, D.E.G., Orr, P.J., Cao, H., 2014. Cryptic iridescence in a fossil weevil generated by single diamond photonic crystals. Journal of the Royal Society Interface 11, 20140736. DOI: https://doi.org/10.1098/rsif.2014.0736.
- Godefroit, P., Sinitsa, S.M., Dhouailly, D., Bolotsky, Y.L., Sizov, A.V., McNamara, M.E., Benton, M.J., Spagna, P., 2014. A Jurassic ornithischian dinosaur from Siberia with both feathers and scales. Science 345, 451-455. DOI: https://doi.org/10.1126/science.1253351.
- Godefroit, P., Sinitsa, S.M., Dhouailly, D., Bolotsky, Y.L., Sizov, A.V., McNamara, M.E., Benton, M.J., Spagna, P., 2014. Response to Comment on ‘A Jurassic ornithischian dinosaur from Siberia with both feathers and scales’. Science 346, 434-435. DOI: https://doi.org/10.1126/science.1260146.
- Anderson, R.P., McCoy, V.E., McNamara, M.E., Briggs, D.E.G., 2014. What big eyes you have: the ecological role of giant pterygotid eurypterids. Biology Letters 10, 2040412. DOI: https://doi.org/10.1098/rsbl.2014.0412.
- McNamara, M.E., Briggs, D.E.G., Orr, P.J. Gupta, N.S., Locatelli, E.R., Qiu, L., Yang, H., Wang, Z., Noh, N., Cao, H., 2013. The fossil record of insect color illuminated by maturation experiments. Geology 47, 487-490. DOI: https://doi.org/10.1130/G33836.1.
- McNamara, M.E., Briggs, D.E.G., Orr, P.J., 2012. The controls on the preservation of structural color in fossil insects. Palaios 27, 443-454. DOI: https://doi.org/10.2110/palo.2012.p12-027r.
- McNamara, M.E., Orr, P.J., Kearns, S., Alcalá, L., Anadón, P., Peñalver, E., 2012. What controls the taphonomy of exceptionally preserved taxa – environment or biology? A case study using exceptionally preserved frogs from the Miocene Libros Konservat-Lagerstätte, Spain. Palaios 27, 63-77. DOI: https://doi.org/10.2110/palo.2010.p10-126r.
- McNamara, M.E., Orr, P.J., Manzocchi, T., Alcalá, L., Anadón, P., Peñalver, E., 2011. Biological controls upon the physical taphonomy of exceptionally preserved salamanders from the Miocene of Rubielos de Mora, northeast Spain. Lethaia 45, 210-226. DOI: https://doi.org/10.1111/j.1502-3931.2011.00274.x.
- McNamara, M.E., Briggs, D.E.G., Orr, P.J., Wedmann, S., Noh, H., Cao, H., 2011. Fossilized biophotonic nanostructures reveal the original colors of 47 million-year-old moths. PLoS Biology 9, e1001200. DOI: https://doi.org/10.1371/journal.pbio.1001200.
- McNamara, M.E., Orr, P.J., Kearns, S., Alcalá, L., Anadón, P., Peñalver, E., 2010. Organic preservation of fossil musculature with ultracellular detail. Proceedings B 277, 423-427. DOI: https://doi.org/10.1098/rspb.2009.1378.
- McNamara, M.E., Orr, P.J., Kearns, S., Alcalá, L., Anadón, P., Peñalver, E., 2009. Exceptionally preserved tadpoles from the Miocene of Libros, Spain: Ecomorphological reconstruction and the impact of ontogeny upon taphonomy. Lethaia 43, 290-306. DOI: https://doi.org/10.1111/j.1502-3931.2009.00192.x.
- McNamara, M.E., Orr, P. J., Kearns, S., Alcalá, L., Anadón, P., Peñalver, E., 2009. Soft tissue preservation in Miocene frogs from Libros (Spain): Insights into the genesis of decay microenvironments. Palaios 24, 104-117. DOI: https://doi.org/10.2110/palo.2008.p08-017r.
- McNamara, M.E., Orr, P.J., Kearns, S., Alcalá, L., Anadón, P., Peñalver, E., 2006. High fidelity preservation of bone marrow in c. 10-million-year-old amphibians. Geology 34, 641-644. DOI: https://doi.org/10.1130/G22526.1.
