= Euan Clarkson =

British paleontologist (1937–2024)

Euan Neilson Kerr Clarkson FRSE (1937 – 31 August 2024) was a British palaeontologist and writer.

== Life and career ==
Clarkson studied geology at the University of Cambridge and had a long career as a palaeontologist at the University of Edinburgh, Scotland. Clarkson's most notable research occurred in the study of trilobites (especially visual systems), Paleozoic stratigraphy and the description of the anatomy of the Conodont animal.

Clarkson had a sustained record of publication and teaching, authored some 100+ papers and other publications, including a book that is widely regarded as the "standard" palaeontological text for undergraduates.

Clarkson was president of the Edinburgh Geological Society (1985–87), a trustee of the Natural History Museum (1987–92) and president of the Palaeontological Association (1998–2000). Clarkson was awarded the Geological Society of London's Coke medal in 2010.

Clarkson died on 31 August 2024, at the age of 87.
