= The Palaeontological Association =

Charitable organization

- Abbreviation: PalAss
- Formation: 1957
- Legal status: Registered charity
- Purpose: Palaeontology, Science Outreach, Education
- Location: UK based (international in scope)
- Members: c. 1200 members
- President: Prof. Phil Dononghue
- Executive Officer: Dr Jo Hellawell
- Website: The Palaeontological Association

The Palaeontological Association (PalAss for short) is a charitable organisation based in the UK founded in 1957 for the promotion of the study of palaeontology and its allied sciences.

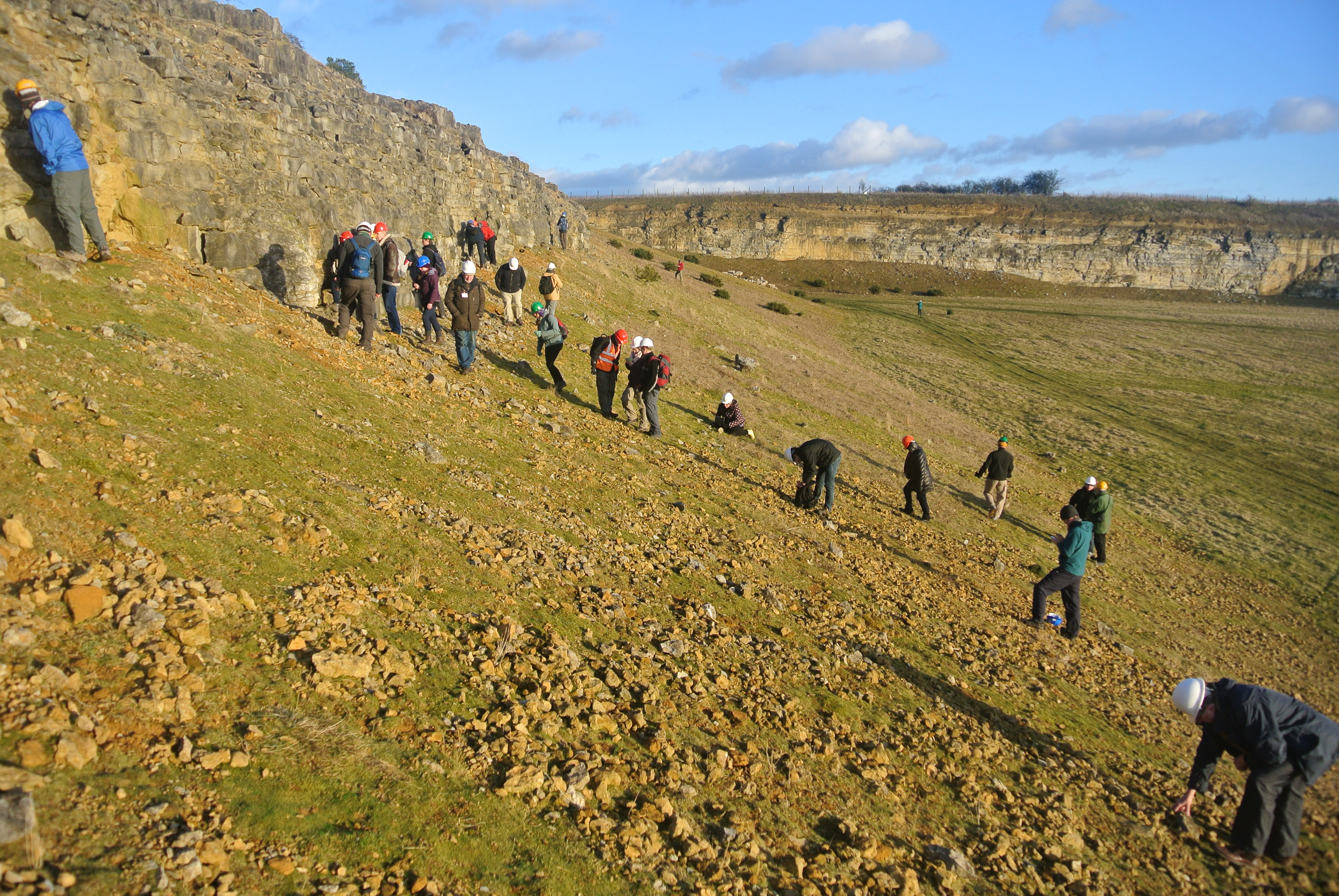
Palaeontological Association field trip to Spaunton Quarry, Yorkshire (December 2014). The main rock unit is the Coralline Oolite Formation (Upper Jurassic).

== Publications ==
The Association publishes two main journals: Palaeontology and Papers in Palaeontology. The latter is the successor to the now discontinued Special Papers in Palaeontology. In addition, the Palaeontology Newsletter is published 3 times per year, and the Field Guides to Fossils series covering important palaeontological biotas is published in book form.

== Awards ==
The Association confers a number of awards, including the Gertrude Elles Award for high-quality public engagement; the Mary Anning Award for outstanding contributions from those not professionally employed in palaeontology; the Hodson Award for exceptional early-career achievement; the President's Medal as a mid-career award; and the organisation's highest award for exceptional lifetime achievement, the Lapworth Medal.

=== Hodson Awardees ===
Awards
Year	Recipient
2023	Rachel C.M. Warnock
2022	Allison C. Daley
2021	Russell J. Garwood
2020	Erin E. Saupe
2019	Silvia Danise
2018	Xiaoya Ma
2017	Stephen L. Brusatte
2016	Susannah C.R. Maidment and Robert S. Sansom
2015	Roger Benson
2014	Maria McNamara
2013	Matthew Friedman
2012	Jakob Vinther
2011	Richard Butler
2010	Thijs Vandenbroucke
2009	Emily Rayfield
2008	Bridget Wade
2007	Shanan Peters
2006	Paul Barrett and Guy Harrington
2005	Philip Donoghue
2004	Heather Wilson
2003	Charlotte Jeffrey
2002	Graham Budd and Matthew Wills
2001	Patrick Orr and Ivan Sansom

=== President's Medal Awardees ===
Source: The Palaeontological Association Medal and Award Winners List

Year	Recipient
2023	Richard J. Butler
2022	Zerina Johanson
2021	Anjali Goswami
2020	Xu Xing
2019	Mark D. Sutton
2018	Emily J. Rayfield
2017	Jennifer C. McElwain
2016	Paul M. Barrett
2015	Graham Budd
2014	Philip C.J. Donoghue
2013	Charles H. Wellman
2012	Harry Dowsett
2011	Gregory Edgecombe
2010	Nicholas Butterfield
2009	Kevin Peterson
2008	Paul Upchurch
