= List of paleontologists =

This is a list of notable paleontologists who have made significant contributions to the field of paleontology. Only paleontologists with biographical articles in Wikipedia are listed here.

== A ==
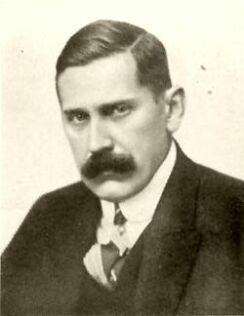
Othenio Abel

- Othenio Abel (Austria, 1875-1946)
- William Abler (United States)
- Karel Absolon (Czech Republic, 1877-1960)
- Louis Agassiz (Switzerland / United States, 1807-1873)
- Emiliano Aguirre (Spain, 1925-2021)
- Per E. Ahlberg (Sweden)
- Gustava Aigner (Austria, 1906-1987)
- Luis Alcalá (Spain)
- Truman H. Aldrich (United States, 1848-1932)
- Richard Aldridge (England, 1945-2014)
- Annie Montague Alexander (Kingdom of Hawaii / United States, 1867-1950)
- John Alroy (United States / Australia, 1966- )
- Vladimir Prokhorovich Amalitskii (Russia, 1860-1917)
- Carlos Ameghino (Argentina, 1865-1936)
- Florentino Ameghino (Argentina, 1854-1911)
- Charles Anderson (Scotland / Australia, 1876-1944)
- Elaine Anderson (United States, 1936-2002)
- Johan Gunnar Andersson (Sweden, 1874-1960)
- Gábor Andreánszky (Hungary, 1895-1967)
- Charles William Andrews (England, 1866-1924)
- Henry Nathaniel Andrews (United States, 1910-2002)
- Mahala Andrews (Scotland, 1939-1997)
- Roy Chapman Andrews (United States, 1884-1960)
- Nicolai Ivanovich Andrusov (Russia, 1861-1924)
- Alberto Angela (Italy, 1962- )
- Ernesto Pérez d'Angelo (Chile, 1932-2013)
- Mary Anning (England, 1799-1847)
- Miguel Telles Antunes (Portugal, 1937- )
- Esther Applin (United States, 1895-1972)
- Camille Arambourg (France, 1885-1969)
- Edward Alexander Newell Arber (England, 1870-1918)
- Sergio Archangelsky (Argentina, 1931-2022)
- Adolphe d'Archiac (France, 1802-1868)
- William Joscelyn Arkell (England, 1904-1958)
- Chester A. Arnold (United States, 1901-1977)
- Juan Luis Arsuaga (Spain, 1954- )
- Berhane Asfaw (Ethiopia, 1954- )
- Hermann Martin Asmuss (Estonia, 1812-1859)
- Sava Athanasiu (Romania, 1861-1946)
- Amy Atwater (United States, 1991- )
- Walter Auffenberg (United States, 1928-2004)
- Stanley Awramik (United States, 1946- )
- Brian Axsmith (United States, 1962-2020)

== B ==
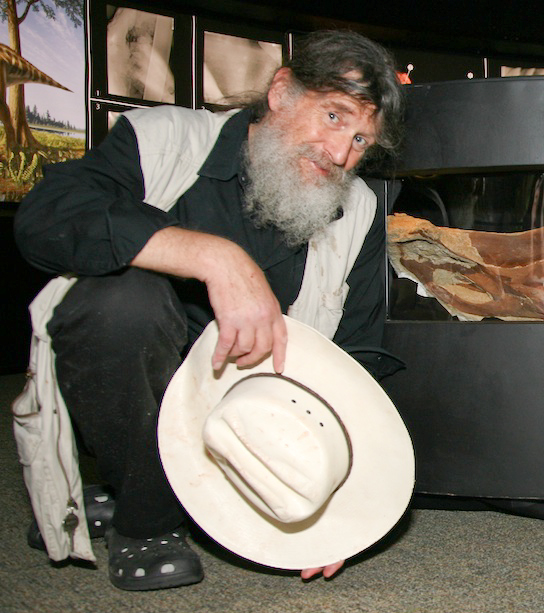
Robert T. Bakker

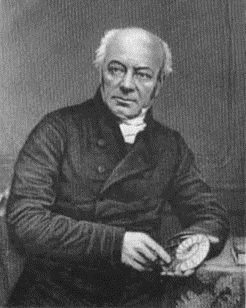
William Buckland

- Catherine E. Badgley (United States, 1950-)
- William Hellier Baily (England, 1819-1888)
- Andrew Geddes Bain (South Africa, 1797-1864)
- Robert T. Bakker (United States, 1945- )
- Jean-Christophe Balouet (France, 1956-2021)
- Harlan Parker Banks (United States, 1913-1998)
- Mário Costa Barberena (Brazil, 1934-2013)
- Erwin Hinckly Barbour (United States, 1856-1947)
- Joachim Barrande (France, 1799-1883)
- Charles Barrois (France, 1851-1939)
- Rinchen Barsbold (Mongolia, 1935- )
- Ray S. Bassler (United States, 1878-1961)
- Dorothea Bate (England, 1878-1951)
- Richard Bateman (United Kingdom, 1958- )
- Francis Arthur Bather (England, 1863-1934)
- Georg Baur (United States, 1859-1898)
- George Bax Holmes (England, 1803-1887)
- Allan Bé (United States, died 1983)
- William Bean (England, 1787-1866)
- K. Christopher Beard (United States)
- William Beard (England, 1772-1868)
- Samuel Beckles (England, 1814-1890)
- Charles Emerson Beecher (United States, 1856-1904)
- Hermann Behmel (Germany, 1939- )
- Kay Behrensmeyer (United States)
- Walter A. Bell (Canada, 1889-1969)
- Romeu Beltrão (Brazil, 1913-1977)
- Etheldred Benett (England, 1776-1845)
- Michael Benton (Scotland, 1956- )
- Georg Karl Berendt (Germany, 1790-1850)
- Wolfgang H. Berger (Germany / United States, 1937-2017)
- Edward W. Berry (United States, 1875-1945)
- Annalisa Berta (United States)
- Charles Eugène Bertrand (France, 1851-1917)
- Paul Bertrand (France, 1879-1944)
- Heinrich Ernst Beyrich (Germany, 1815-1896)
- Gertruda Biernat (Poland, 1923-2016)
- Peter von Bitter (Canada)
- Alexander Bittner (Austria, 1850-1902)
- Hans C. Bjerring (Sweden, 1931- )
- Philip R. Bjork (United States)
- Richard S. Boardman (United States, 1923-2011)
- Birger Bohlin (Sweden, 1898-1990)
- Johannes Böhm (Germany, 1857-1938)
- José Bonaparte (Argentina, 1928-2020)
- Matthew Bonnan (United States)
- Lieuwe Dirk Boonstra (South Africa, 1905-1975)
- Pramatha Nath Bose (India, 1855-1934)
- Marcellin Boule (France, 1861-1942)
- Michael Boulter (England, 1942–2025)
- James Scott Bowerbank (England, 1797-1877)
- Henry Bowman Brady (England, 1835-1891)
- Charles Kimberlin Brain (South Africa)
- Wilhelm von Branca (Germany, 1844-1928)
- Leonard R. Brand (United States, 1941- )
- Martin Brasier (England, 1947-2014)
- Auguste Bravard (France, 1803-1861)
- William J. Breed (United States, 1928-2013)
- Stoycho Vassilev Breskovski (Bulgaria, 1934-2004)
- Derek Briggs (Ireland / United States, 1950- )
- Mitja Brodar (Slovenia, 1921-2012)
- Srečko Brodar (Slovenia, 1893-1987)
- Pierce Brodkorb (United States, 1908-1992)
- Magnus Bromelius (Sweden, 1679-1731)
- Adolphe-Théodore Brongniart (France, 1801-1876)
- Heinrich Georg Bronn (Germany, 1800-1862)
- Robert Broom (Scotland / South Africa, 1866-1951)
- Barnum Brown (United States, 1873-1963)
- Roland W. Brown (United States, 1893-1961)
- Michel Brunet (France, 1940- )
- Stephen L. Brusatte (United States, 1984- )
- Christian Leopold von Buch (Germany, 1774-1853)
- Walter Hermann Bucher (Germany / United States, 1888-1965)
- Mary Buckland (England, 1797-1857)
- William Buckland (England, 1784-1856)
- Sydney Savory Buckman (England, 1860-1929)
- Graham Budd (England, 1968- )
- Oliver Bulman (England, 1902-1974)
- Emanuel Bunzel (Austria, 1828-1895)
- George Busk (England, 1807-1886)
- Charles Butts (United States, 1863-1946)
- Alexey Bystrow (Russia / Soviet Union, 1899-1959)

== C ==
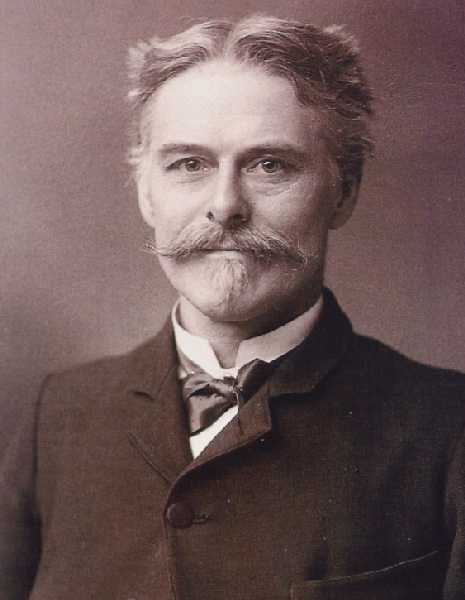
Edward Drinker Cope

- Susan Cachel (United States)
- André Cailleux (France, 1907-1986)
- Jaci Antonio Louzada Tupi Caldas (Brazil, 1898-1946)
- Mary Gordon Calder (Scotland, 1906-1992)
- Jorge O. Calvo (Argentina, 1961- 2023)
- Adriaan Gilles Camper (Netherlands, 1759-1820)
- Gustave Campiche (Switzerland, 1809-1871)
- Ferdinand Canu (France, 1863-1932)
- Giovanni Capellini (Italy, 1833-1922)
- Eudald Carbonell (Spain, 1953- )
- Daniel Cargnin (paleontologist) (Brazil, 1930-2002)
- Kenneth Carpenter (Japan, 1949- )
- Thomas Carr (paleontologist) (Canada)
- Robert L. Carroll (United States, 1938-2020)
- Rodolfo Casamiquela (Argentina, 1932-2008)
- Ermine Cowles Case (United States, 1871-1953)
- Marjorie Chandler (England, 1897-1983)
- Meemann Chang (China, 1936- )
- Frederick Chapman (England / Australia, 1864-1943)
- Wilfrid Chapman (England, 1891-1955)
- Alan Charig (England, 1927-1997)
- Edward Charlesworth (England, 1813-1893)
- Sankar Chatterjee (United States)
- James Chatters (United States, 1949- )
- Alan Cheetham (United States, 1928- )
- Feodosy Chernyshov (Russia, 1856-1914)
- Luis M. Chiappe (Argentina)
- Karen Chin (United States)
- Anusuya Chinsamy-Turan (South Africa)
- Henry Christy (England, 1810-1865)
- Jenny Clack (England, 1947-2020)
- T. H. Clark (Canada, 1893-1996)
- John Mason Clarke (United States, 1857-1928)
- Preston Cloud (United States, 1912-1991)
- Grigore Cobălcescu (Romania, 1831-1892)
- Alberto Cobos (Spain)
- Edwin Harris Colbert (United States, 1905-2001)
- Desmond H. Collins (Canada)
- Margaret Collinson(England, )
- Fabio Colonna (Italy, 1567-1640)
- William Conybeare (England, 1787-1857)
- Isabel Clifton Cookson (Australia, 1893-1973)
- Edward Drinker Cope (United States, 1840-1897)
- Rodolfo Coria (Argentina, 1959- )
- Shirley Coryndon (1926-1976)
- Maurice Cossmann (France, 1850-1924)
- Joseph Pitty Couthouy (United States, 1808-1864)
- Carlos de Paula Couto (Brazil, 1910-1982)
- Leslie Reginald Cox (England, 1897-1965)
- Henry Crampton (United States, 1875-1956)
- Peter Crane (England, )
- Carl Hermann Credner (Germany, 1841-1913)
- Irene Crespin (Australia, 1896-1980)
- Walter Drawbridge Crick (England, 1857-1903)
- Margaret Crosfield (England, 1859-1952)
- Ilona Csepreghyné-Meznerics (Hungary, 1906 –1977)
- Osvaldo Rodrigues da Cunha (Brazil, 1930-2011)
- Ethel Currie (Scotland, 1899-1901)
- Philip J. Currie (Canada, 1949- )
- Kristina Curry Rogers (United States)
- Georges Cuvier (France, 1769-1832)
- Jan Czerski (Poland, 1845-1892)

== D ==
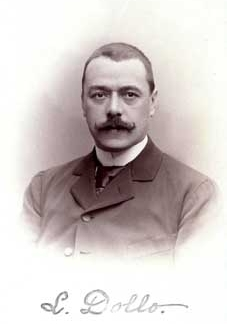
Louis Dollo

- Ted Daeschler (United States)
- Anne Dambricourt-Malassé (France, 1959- )
- Wilhelm Dames (Germany, 1843-1898)
- Robert Damon (England, 1814-1889)
- Thomas Davidson (Scotland, 1817-1885)
- A. Morley Davies (England)
- William Davies (England, 1814-1891)
- John William Dawson (Canada, 1820–1899)
- Mary R. Dawson (United States)
- Henry De la Beche (England, 1796-1855)
- Tao Deng (China, 1963- )
- Charles Depéret (France, 1854-1929)
- Peter Dodson (United States)
- Louis Dollo (France / Belgium, 1857-1931)
- Dong Zhiming (China, 1937- )
- Philip Donoghue (England)
- Stephen Donovan (England, 1954- )
- Erling Dorf (United States, 1905-1984)
- François Doumergue (France, 1858-1938)
- Joseph Henri Ferdinand Douvillé (France, 1846-1937)
- Eugène Dubois (Netherlands, 1858-1940)
- Émilien Dumas (France, 1804-1873)
- William Sutherland Dun (Australia, 1868-1934)
- Carl Owen Dunbar (United States, 1891-1979)
- Peter Martin Duncan (England, 1824-1891)
- Wilhelm Dunker (Germany, 1809-1885)
- David Dunkle (United States, 1911-1984)
- Gareth J. Dyke (Ireland)

== E ==
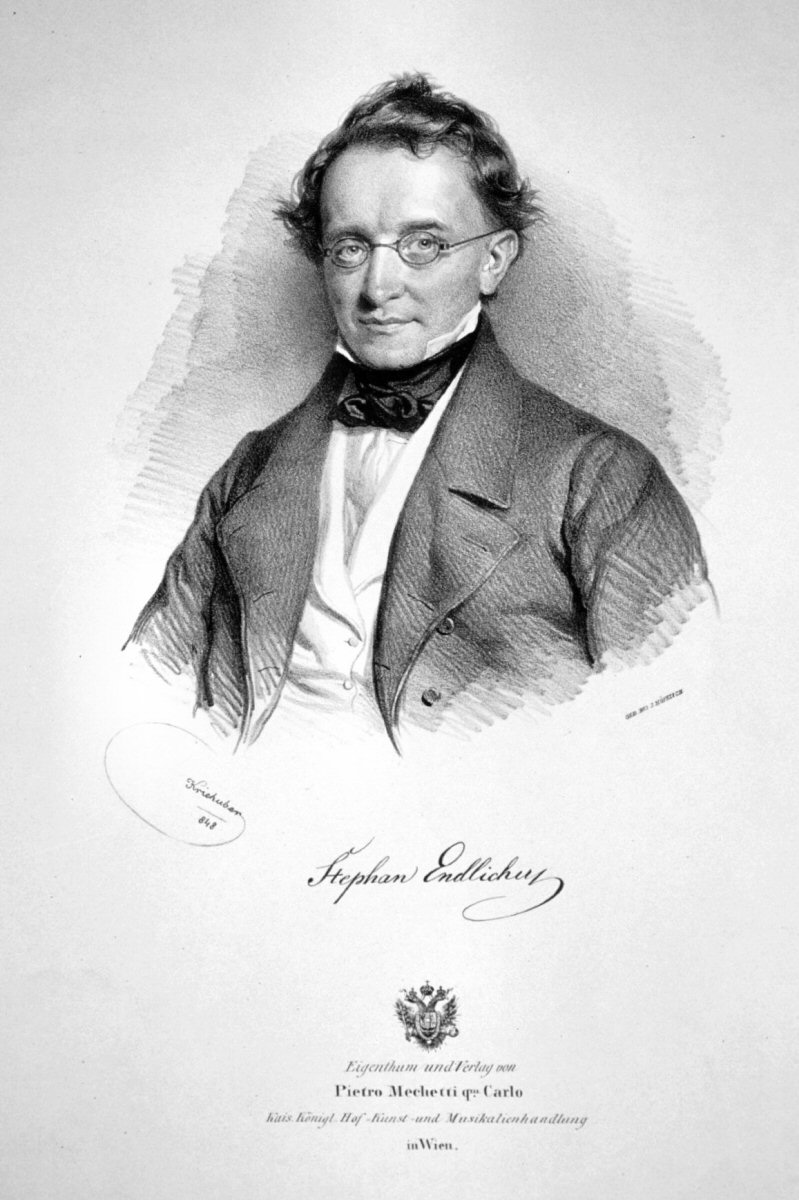
Stephan Endlicher

- Tilly Edinger (Germany / United States, 1897-1967)
- Dianne Edwards (England, 1942- )
- Sir Philip Grey Egerton, 10th Baronet (England, 1806-1881)
- Niles Eldredge (United States, 1943- )
- Andrzej Elżanowski (Poland, 1950- )
- Ashton F. Embry (Canada, 1946- )
- Cesare Emiliani (Italy / United States, 1922-1995)
- Douglas Emlong (United States, 1942-1980)
- Hermann Friedrich Emmrich (Germany, 1815-1879)
- Stephan Endlicher (Austria, 1804-1849)
- Michael S. Engel (United States, 1971- )
- Bruce Erickson (United States, 1933-2022)
- Gregory M. Erickson (United States)
- Gundolf Ernst (Germany, 1930-2002)
- Douglas Erwin (United States)
- Kirill Eskov (Russia, 1956- )
- Robert Etheridge (England, 1819-1903)
- Robert Etheridge, Junior (England / Australia, 1847-1920)
- Constantin von Ettingshausen (Austria, 1826-1897)
- Eugène Eudes-Deslongchamps (France, 1830-1889)
- Jacques Amand Eudes-Deslongchamps (France, 1794-1867)
- Susan E. Evans (England)

== F ==
- Hugh Falconer (Scotland, 1808-1865)
- Paul Fallot (France, 1889-1960)
- Mikhail Fedonkin (Russia, 1946- )
- Carroll Lane Fenton (United States, 1900-1969)
- Mildred Adams Fenton (United States, 1899-1995)
- Egidio Feruglio (Italy, 1897-1954)
- Harold John Finlay (New Zealand, 1901-1951)
- Clive Finlayson (Gibraltar, 1955- )
- Geraldine Finlayson (Gibraltar)
- Anthony Fiorillo (United States)
- Paul Henri Fischer (France, 1835-1893)
- Gotthelf Fischer von Waldheim (Germany, 1771-1853)
- Tim Flannery (Australia, 1956- )
- Rousseau H. Flower (United States, 1913-1988)
- August Foerste (United States, 1862-1936)
- Michael Foote (United States, 1963- )
- Edward Forbes (Isle of Man, 1815-1854)
- Carlo Fornasini (Italy, 1854-1931)
- Mikael Fortelius (Finland, 1954- )
- Catherine Forster (United States)
- Clive Forster-Cooper (England, 1880-1947)
- Richard Fortey (England, 1946- )
- John Foster (United States, 1966- )
- William Parker Foulke (United States, 1816-1865)
- William Fox (England, 1813-1881)
- Eberhard Fraas (Germany, 1862-1915)
- Georgii Frederiks (Russia / Soviet Union, 1889-1938)
- Childs Frick (United States, 1883-1965)
- Antonin Fritsch (Czech Republic, 1832-1913)
- Karl von Fritsch (Germany, 1838-1906)
- Michael Frogley (United Kingdom)

== G ==
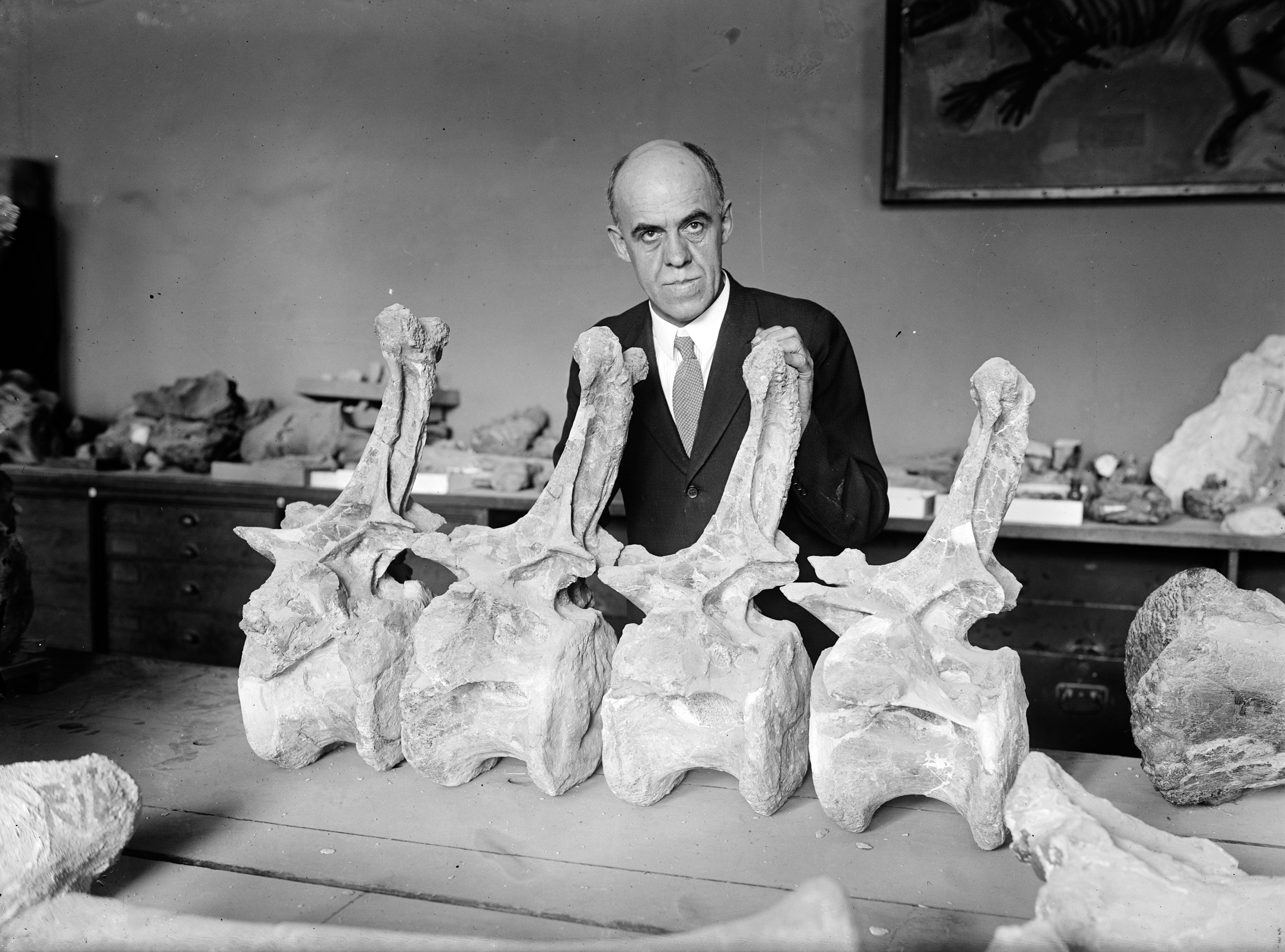
Charles W. Gilmore

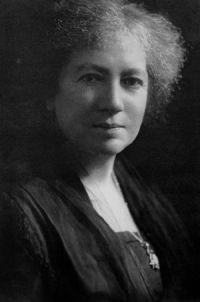
Maria Gordon

- William More Gabb (United States, 1839-1878)
- Eugene S. Gaffney (United States)
- Peter Galton (England, 1942- )
- Taiping Gao (China, 1984- )
- Kenneth Garrett (United States, 1953- )
- Bartolomeo Gastaldi (Italy, 1818-1879)
- Charles-Théophile Gaudin (Switzerland, 1822-1866)
- Jean Albert Gaudry (France, 1827-1908)
- Sabine Gaudzinski-Windheuser (Germany, 1965- )
- Jacques Gauthier (United States)
- Charles Lewis Gazin (United States, 1904-1995)
- Henry Gee (England, 1962- )
- Ross Geller (United States)
- Paul Gervais (France, 1816-1879)
- James W. Gidley (United States, 1866-1931)
- Christoph Gottfried Andreas Giebel (Germany, 1820-1881)
- Edmund Dwen Gill (Australia, 1908-1986)
- David Gillette (United States)
- Charles W. Gilmore (United States, 1874-1945)
- Philip D. Gingerich (United States, 1946- )
- George Herbert Girty (United States, 1869-1939)
- Bernard du Bus de Gisignies (Netherlands / Belgium, 1808-1874)
- Martin Glaessner (Austria-Hungary / Australia, 1906-1989)
- Ludwig Glauert (England / Australia, 1879-1963)
- Ernst Friedrich Glocker (Germany, 1793-1858)
- Pascal Godefroit (Belgium)
- Georg August Goldfuss (Germany, 1782-1848)
- Heinrich Göppert (Germany, 1800-1884)
- Mackenzie Gordon, Jr. (United States, 1913–1992)
- Maria Gordon (Scotland, 1864–1939)
- Dragutin Gorjanović-Kramberger (Croatia, 1856-1936)
- Stephen Jay Gould (United States, 1941-2002)
- David J. Gower (England)
- Amadeus William Grabau (United States / China, 1870-1946)
- Walter W. Granger (United States, 1872-1941)
- Bruno Granier (France)
- Richard E. Grant (United States, 1927-1995)
- Joseph T. Gregory (United States, 1914-2007)
- William King Gregory (United States, 1876-1970)
- Amanz Gressly (Switzerland, 1814-1865)
- David Grimaldi (United States, 1957- )
- Vera Gromova (Russia / Soviet Union, 1891-1973)
- Walter R. Gross (Germany, 1903-1974)
- Józef Grzybowski (Poland, 1869-1922)

== H ==
- George Haas (Austria, 1905-1981)
- Julius von Haast (Germany, 1822-1887)
- Jules Haime (France, 1824-1856)
- James Hall (United States, 1811-1898)
- Valerie Hall (Ireland)
- Anthony Hallam (England, 1933-2017)
- Beverly Halstead (England, 1933-1991)
- David Harper (England)
- Tom Harris England)
- Hasegawa Yoshikazu (Japan, 1930-)
- John Bell Hatcher (United States, 1861-1904)
- Sidney H. Haughton (England / South Africa, 1888-1982)
- Oliver Perry Hay (United States, 1846-1930)
- Angelo Heilprin (United States, 1853-1907)
- Anatol Heintz (Norway, 1898-1975)
- Natascha Heintz (Norway, 1930- )
- Sam W. Heads (England, 1983- )
- Oswald Heer (Switzerland, 1809-1883)
- Gerhard Heilmann (Denmark, 1859-1946)
- Sue Hendrickson (United States, 1949- )
- Edwin Hennig (Germany, 1882-1977)
- Gunnar Henningsmoen (Norway, 1919-1996)
- Victoria Herridge (England)
- Franz Martin Hilgendorf (Germany, 1839-1904)
- Edward Hitchcock (United States, 1793-1864)
- Scott Hocknull (Australia)
- Ove Arbo Høeg (Norway, 1898-1993)
- Johann Leonard Hoffmann (Netherlands, 1710-1782)
- Hans J. Hofmann (Germany / Canada, 1936-2010)
- William Jacob Holland (United States, 1848-1932)
- J. Alan Holman (United States, 1931-2006)
- Keith Holmes (Australia)
- Thomas R. Holtz, Jr. (United States, 1965- )
- Dirk Albert Hooijer (Netherlands, 1919-1993)
- Reginald Hooley (England, 1865-1923)
- James Hopson (United States, 1935- )
- Jack Horner (United States, 1946- )
- Moritz Hornes (Austria, 1815-1868)
- Lukas Hottinger (Switzerland, 1933-2011)
- Nicholas Hotton III (United States, 1920/21-1999)
- Hildegarde Howard (United States, 1901-1998)
- Friedrich von Huene (Germany, 1875-1969)
- Alois Humbert (Switzerland, 1829-1887)
- Julian P. Hume (England, 1960- )
- Jean Jacques Nicolas Huot (France, 1790-1845)
- Pierre Hupé (France, 1907-2003)
- Jørn Hurum (Norway, 1967- )
- Thomas Henry Huxley (England, 1825-1895)
- Alpheus Hyatt (United States, 1838-1902)

== I ==
- Nizar Ibrahim (Germany / Morocco, 1982- )
- Thomas Image (England, 1772-1856)
- Wataru Ishijima (Japan, 1906-1980)
- Arturo Issel (Italy, 1842-1922)

== J ==
- David Jablonski (United States, 1953- )
- Auguste Jaccard (Switzerland, 1833-1895)
- Louis L. Jacobs (United States, 1948- )
- Sohan Lal Jain (India)
- Helen F. James (United States, 1956- )
- Werner Janensch (Germany, 1878-1969)
- Philippe Janvier (France)
- Erik Jarvik (Sweden, 1829-1901)
- Dick Jefferies (England)
- Farish Jenkins (United States, 1940-2012)
- James A. Jensen (United States, 1918-1998)
- Kirk Johnson (United States, 1960- )
- Frederik Johnstrup (Denmark, 1818-1894)
- Theobald Jones (Ireland, 1790-1868)
- Thomas Rupert Jones (England, 1819-1911)

== K ==
- Josephine Kablick (Czech Republic, 1787-1863)
- Myra Keen (United States, 1905-1986)
- Gerta Keller (Switzerland / United States, 1945- )
- Alexander Kellner (Brazil, 1961- )
- Remington Kellogg (United States, 1892-1969)
- Doris Kermack (England, 1923-2003)
- Kenneth Kermack (England, 1919-2000)
- Andre Keyser (South Africa, 1938-2010)
- Alexander Keyserling (Russia, 1815-1891)
- Johan Aschehoug Kiær (Norway, 1869–1931)
- Zofia Kielan-Jaworowska (Poland, 1925-2015)
- Caitlín R. Kiernan (United States, 1964- )
- Kamoya Kimeu (Kenya, 1940- )
- William King (Ireland / England, 1809-1886)
- James Kirkland (United States, 1954- )
- James Kitching (South Africa, 1922-2003)
- Andrew H. Knoll (United States, 1959- )
- Yoshitsugu Kobayashi (Japan, 1971-)
- Gustav Heinrich Ralph von Koenigswald (Germany / Netherlands, 1902-1982)
- Anastas Kondo (Albania, 1937-2006)
- Laurent-Guillaume de Koninck (Belgium, 1809-1887)
- Andreas Kornhuber (Austria, 1824-1905)
- Vladimir Kovalevsky (Russia, 1842-1883)
- Roman Kozłowski (Poland, 1889-1977)
- Jaroslav Kraft (Czech Republic, 1940-2007)
- Miklós Kretzoi (Hungary, 1907-2005)
- Afrikan Nikolaevich Krishtofovich (Russia, 1885-1953)
- Evgeny Kurochkin (Russia, 1940-2011)
- Sergei Kurzanov (Russia, 1947- )
- Björn Kurtén (Finland, 1924-1988)
- Nikolai Yakovlevich Kuznetsov (Russia, 1873-1948)

== L ==
- Philippe de La Harpe (Switzerland, 1830-1882)
- Kenneth Lacovara (United States)
- Matt Lamanna (United States)
- Lawrence Lambe (Canada, 1863-1919)
- Charles Lamberton (France, 1876-1960)
- Kálmán Lambrecht (Hungary, 1889-1936)
- Archibald Lamont (Scotland, 1907-1985)
- Wann Langston, Jr. (United States, 1921-2013)
- Jia Lanpo (China, 1908-2001)
- Albert-Félix de Lapparent (France, 1905-1975)
- Peter Larson (United States, 1952- )
- Édouard Lartet (France, 1801-1871)
- Louis Lartet (France, 1840-1899)
- Gustav Karl Laube (Germany / Czech Republic, 1839-1923)
- Charles Léopold Laurillard (France, 1783-1853)
- Michel Laurin (Canada)
- René Lavocat (France)
- Louise Leakey (Kenya, 1972- )
- Richard Leakey (Kenya, 1944–2022)
- Alfred Nicholson Leeds (England, 1847-1917)
- Serge Legendre (France)
- Joseph Leidy (United States, 1823-1891)
- André Leroi-Gourhan (France, 1911-1986)
- Don Lessem (United States, 1951- )
- Riccardo Levi-Setti (Italy, 1927-2018)
- Bruce Lieberman (United States)
- Giancarlo Ligabue (Italy, 1931-2015)
- Venceslau de Sousa Pereira de Lima (Portugal, 1858-1919)
- Jere H. Lipps (United States, 1939- )
- Martin Lockley (England)
- Alfred R. Loeblich Jr (United States, 1914-1994)
- Helen Niña Tappan Loeblich (United States, 1917-2004)
- John A. Long (Australia, 1957- )
- Albert Heber Longman (England / Australia, 1880-1954)
- Jane Longstaff (England, 1855-1935)
- William Lonsdale (England, 1794-1871)
- Frederic Brewster Loomis (United States, 1873-1937)
- Perceval de Loriol (Switzerland, 1828-1908)
- Lü Junchang (China, 1965-2018)
- Spencer G. Lucas (United States)
- R. S. Lull (United States, 1867-1957)
- Peter Wilhelm Lund (Denmark / Brazil, 1801-1880)
- Tyler Lyson (United States)

== M ==
- James "Jim" Henry Madsen Jr. (United States, 1932-2009)
- Evgeny Maleev (Soviet Union, 1915-1966)
- Matsumoto Hikoshichirō (Japan, 1887–1975)
- Mirko Malez (Croatia, 1924-1990)
- Francesco Mallegni (Italy)
- V. Standish Mallory (United States, 1919-2003)
- Gideon Mantell (England, 1790-1852)
- Alexander V. Markov (Russia, 1965- )
- Brian John Marples (England / New Zealand, 1907-1997)
- Othniel Charles Marsh (United States, 1831-1899)
- Anthony J. Martin (United States)
- Larry Martin (United States, 1943-2013)
- Paul S. Martin (United States, 1928-2010)
- William Martin (England, 1767-1810)
- Nieves López Martínez (Spain, 1949-2010)
- Andrey Vasilyevich Martynov (Russia, 1879-1938)
- John Marwick (New Zealand, 1891-1978)
- Teresa Maryańska (Poland)
- Octávio Mateus (Portugal, 1975- )
- William Diller Matthew (United States, 1871-1930)
- Vratislav Mazák (Czech Republic, 1937-1987)
- J. C. McConnell (United States, 1844-1904)
- Frederick McCoy (Ireland / Australia, 1817-1899)
- Malcolm McKenna (United States, 1930-2008)
- Mark McMenamin (United States)
- Fielding Bradford Meek (United States, 1817-1876)
- Felipe Mendez (Argentina, 1897-?)
- Peter Merian (Switzerland, 1795-1883)
- John Campbell Merriam (United States, 1869-1945)
- Jean-Louis Hardouin Michelin de Choisy (France, 1786-1867)
- John Samuel Miller (England, 1779-1830)
- Pierre-Aimé Millet (France, 1783-1873)
- Angela Milner (England)
- Dick Mol (Netherlands, 1955- )
- Neale Monks (England, 1971- )
- Raymond C. Moore (United States, 1892-1974)
- John Morris (England, 1810-1886)
- Simon Conway Morris (England, 1951- )
- J.A. Moy-Thomas (England, 1908-1944)
- Salvador Moyà-Solà (Spain, 1955- )
- Benjamin Franklin Mudge (United States, 1817-1879)
- Atílio Munari (Brazil, 1901-1941)
- Francisco Javier Muñiz (Argentina, 1795-1871)
- Dmitrii Mushketov (Russia, 1882-1938)

== N ==
- Darren Naish (England, 1975- )
- Alfred Gabriel Nathorst (Sweden, 1850-1921)
- Theodor Anton Neagu (Romania, 1932-2017)
- Sterling Nesbitt (United States, 1982- )
- Edwin Tulley Newton (England, 1840-1930)
- Elizabeth Nicholls (Canada, 1946-2004)
- Henry Alleyne Nicholson (Scotland, 1844-1899)
- Adolf Carl Noé (Austria / United States, 1873-1939)
- Franz Nopcsa von Felső-Szilvás (Hungary, 1877-1933)
- Alexander von Nordmann (Finland, 1803-1866)
- Mark Norell (United States, 1957- )
- David B. Norman (England)
- Fernando Novas (Argentina)
- Nestor Ivanovich Novozhilov (Russia)

== O ==
- Vladimir Obruchev (Russia, 1863-1956)
- Klaus Oeggl (Austria, 1955- )
- Chonosuke Okamura (Japan)
- Thomas Oldham (Ireland / England, 1816-1878)
- Walter Oliver (Australia / New Zealand, 1883-1957)
- Paul E. Olsen (United States, 1953- )
- Stanley John Olsen (United States, 1919-2003)
- Everett C. Olson (United States, 1910-1993)
- Armin Öpik (Estonia / Australia, 1898-1983)
- Alcide d'Orbigny (France, 1802-1857)
- Yuri Alexandrovich Orlov (Russia, 1893-1966)
- Tor Ørvig (Sweden, 1916-1994)
- Henry Fairfield Osborn (United States, 1857-1935)
- Halszka Osmólska (Poland, 1930-2008)
- John Ostrom (United States, 1928-2005)
- Richard Owen (England, 1804-1892)
- Katsura Ōyama (Japan, 1917-1995)
- Ozawa Yoshiaki (Japan, 1989-1929)

== P ==
- Kevin Padian (United States, 1951- )
- Miquel Crusafont i Pairó (Spain, 1910-1983)
- Allison R. Palmer (United States, 1927- )
- C. Phil Palmer (England)
- Katherine Van Winkle Palmer (United States, 1895–1982)
- Heinz Christian Pander (Russia, 1794-1865)
- James Parkinson (England, 1755-1824)
- William Parks (Canada, 1868-1936)
- Bryan Patterson (England / United States, 1909-1979)
- Colin Patterson (England, 1933-1998)
- Gregory S. Paul (United States, 1954- )
- Alexei Petrovich Pavlov (Russia, 1854-1929)
- Maria Pavlova (Russia, 1854-1938)
- Rajko Pavlovec (Slovenia, 1932-2013)
- Frank Peabody (United States, 1914-1958)
- Pei Wenzhong (China, 1904-1982)
- David P. Penhallow (United States / Canada, 1854-1910)
- Ernesto Pérez d'Angelo (Chile, 1932–2013)
- Altangerel Perle (Mongolia, 1945- )
- Jaroslav Perner (Czech Republic, 1869-1947)
- Léon Pervinquière (France, 1873-1913)
- Luigi Piacenza (Italy, 1935-2009)
- Josef Ladislav Píč (Czech Republic, 1847-1911)
- Martin Pickford (England / Kenya)
- Elizabeth Philpot (England, 1780-1857)
- Guy Ellcock Pilgrim (England, 1875-1943)
- Irajá Damiani Pinto (Brazil, 1919-2014)
- Edna P. Plumstead (South Africa, 1903-1989)
- P. David Polly (United States / United Kingdom)
- Auguste Pomel (France, 1821-1898)
- Yuri Alexandrovich Popov (Russia, 1936-2016)
- Jean-François-Albert du Pouget (France, 1818-1904)
- Vicentino Prestes de Almeida (Brazil, 1900-1954)
- Llewellyn Ivor Price (Brazil, 1905-1980)
- Donald Prothero (United States, 1954- )
- Mark Purnell (England)
- Gregory S Paul (United States, 1954- )

== Q ==
- Qiaomei Fu (People's Republic of China, born 1982)
- Heinrich Quiring (Germany, 1883-1964)

== R ==
- Anton Ramovš (Slovenia, 1924-2011)
- Alexandr Rasnitsyn (Russia)
- Guilherme Rau (Brazil, ?-1953)
- David M. Raup (United States, 1933-2015)
- Emily Rayfield (England)
- Manfred Reichel (Switzerland, 1896-1984)
- Osvaldo Reig (Argentina, 1929-1992)
- Roy Herbert Reinhart (United States, 1919-2005)
- Zeev Reiss (Israel, 1917-1996)
- Robert R. Reisz (Canada, 1947- )
- Bernard Renault (France, 1836-1904)
- Eugène Renevier (Switzerland, 1831-1906)
- Charles Repenning (United States, 1922-2005)
- Charles E. Resser (United States, 1889-1943)
- Gregory Retallack (United States, 1951- )
- August Emanuel von Reuss (Austria, 1811-1873)
- Emma Richter (Germany 1888-1956)
- Armand de Ricqlès (France, 1938-1963)
- Elmer S. Riggs (United States, 1869-1963)
- François Jules Pictet de la Rive (Switzerland, 1809-1872)
- Rosalvina Rivera (Peru, 1914–2011)
- John T. Robinson (South Africa, 1923-2001)
- Boris Rohdendorf (Russia, 1904-1977)
- Josef Victor Rohon (Austria, 1845-1923)
- Alfred Romer (United States, 1894-1973)
- Marcus R. Ross (United States, 1976- )
- Claudia Roth (France)
- Santiago Roth (Switzerland / Argentina, 1850-1924)
- Rafael Royo-Torres (Spain)
- Anatoly Konstantinovich Rozhdestvensky (Russia, 1920-1983)
- John Ruben (United States)
- Rudolf Ruedemann (United States, 1864-1956)
- Bruce Runnegar (Australia, 1941- )
- Dale Russell (Canada / United States, 1937-2019)
- Vasiliy E. Ruzhentsev (Russia, 1899-1978)
- Natalia Rybczynski (Canada)

== S ==
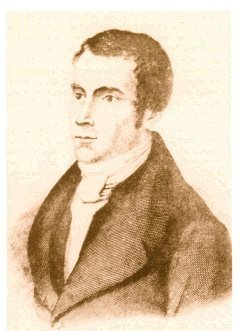
Philippe-Charles Schmerling

- Karol Sabath (Poland, 1963-2007)
- John William Salter (England, 1820-1869)
- Scott D. Sampson (Canada, 1961- )
- William J. Sanders (United States)
- Ivan Sansom (Wales)
- Gaston de Saporta (France, 1823-1895)
- Henri Émile Sauvage (France, 1842-1917)
- R. J. G. Savage (UK, 1927-1998)
- Gunnar Säve-Söderbergh (Sweden, 1910-1948)
- Steven Schafersman (United States)
- Viera Scheibner (Slovakia, 1935- )
- Johann Jakob Scheuchzer (Switzerland, 1672-1733)
- Judith Schiebout (United States)
- Erich Maren Schlaikjer (United States, 1905-1972)
- Philippe-Charles Schmerling (Netherlands / Belgium, 1790-1836)
- Robert M. Schoch (United States)
- J. William Schopf (United States, 1941- )
- Frederick Schram (United States, 1943- )
- Charles Schuchert (United States, 1858-1942)
- Mary Higby Schweitzer (United States)
- William Berryman Scott (United States, 1858-1947)
- Samuel Hubbard Scudder (United States, 1837-1911)
- Harry Seeley (England, 1839-1909)
- Adolf Seilacher (Germany, 1925-2014)
- Brigitte Senut (France, 1954- )
- Jack Sepkoski (United States, 1948-1999)
- Paul Sereno (United States, 1957- )
- Ethel Shakespear (England, 1871-1946)
- Nathaniel Shaler (United States, 1841-1906)
- Aleksandr Grigorevich Sharov (Russia)
- Charles Davies Sherborn (England, 1861-1942)
- Shigeyasu Tokunaga (Japan, 1874–1940)
- Shikama Tokio (Japan, 1912-1978)
- Neil Shubin (United States, 1960- )
- Christian Sidor (United States)
- Gloria Jean Siebrecht (United States, 1940- )
- Ion Th. Simionescu (Romania, 1873-1944)
- George Gaylord Simpson (United States, 1902-1984)
- Martin I. Simpson (England)
- Christopher P. Sloan (United States, 1954- )
- M. Paul Smith (England)
- Boris Sergeyevich Sokolov (Russia, 1914-2013)
- Leonard Frank Spath (England, 1882-1957)
- Zdeněk Špinar (Czech Republic, 1916-1995)
- Robert Masterman Stainforth (England, 1915-2002)
- Herbert F. Standing (Madagascar)
- Steven M. Stanley (United States, 1941- )
- Hans Georg Stehlin (Switzerland, 1870-1941)
- Erik Stensiö (Sweden, 1891-1984)
- Charles Hazelius Sternberg (United States, 1850-1943)
- Charles Mortram Sternberg (United States / Canada, 1885-1981)
- Kaspar Maria von Sternberg (Czech Republic, 1761-1838)
- Charles Stokes (England, 1780s-1853)
- Ferdinand Stoliczka (Austria / Czech Republic, 1838-1874)
- Henry Stopes (England, 1852-1902)
- Marie Stopes (England, 1880-1958)
- Antonio Stoppani (Italy, 1824-1891)
- Leif Størmer (Norway, 1905-1979)
- J. Willis Stovall (United States, 1891-1953)
- George William Stow (England / South Africa, 1822-1882)
- Ernst Stromer (Germany, 1871-1952)
- Samuel Stutchbury (England, 1798-1859)
- Hans-Dieter Sues (United States)
- Robert M. Sullivan (United States, 1951- )
- William Elgin Swinton (Scotland / Canada)
- Władysław Szajnocha (Poland, 1857-1928)

== T ==
- Mignon Talbot (United States, 1869-1950)
- Darren Tanke (Canada, 1960- )
- Philippe Taquet (France, 1940- )
- Paul Tasch (United States, 1910-2001)
- Leonid Petrovich Tatarinov (Russia, 1926-2011)
- Ian Tattersall (England / United States, 1945- )
- Juan Tavera (Chile, 1917-1991)
- Mike P. Taylor (England, 1968- )
- Richard H. Tedford (United States, 1929-2011)
- Curt Teichert (Germany / United States, 1905-1996)
- Pierre Teilhard de Chardin (France, 1881-1955)
- Geneviève Termier (France, 1917-2005)
- Henry Testot-Ferry (France, 1826-1869)
- Nicolas Théobald (France, 1903-1981)
- Robert C. Thorne (United States, 1898-1960)
- Raymond Thorsteinsson (Canada, 1921-2012)
- Richard A. Thulborn (England)
- Bruce H. Tiffney (United States)
- Eduard Toll (Russia)
- Tomida Yukimitsu (Japan, 1950-)
- Zsófia Torma (Hungary, 1832-1899)
- Ramsay Traquair (Scotland, 1840-1912)
- Georges de Tribolet (Switzerland, 1830-1873)
- Ronald Pearson Tripp (England, 1914-2001)
- Gustaf Troedsson (Sweden, 1891-1954)
- Joseph Tyrrell (Canada, 1858-1957)

== U ==
- Viktor Uhlig (Austria, 1857-1911)
- Edward Oscar Ulrich (United States, 1857-1944)
- Franz Unger (Austria, 1800-1870)

== V ==
- Pierre-Joseph van Beneden (Belgium, 1809-1894)
- Gerard Frederick van Tets (England / Canada / Australia, 1929-1995)
- Blaire Van Valkenburgh (United States)
- Trevor Valle (United States, 1975- )
- Geerat J. Vermeij (Netherlands / United States, 1946- )
- Édouard de Verneuil (France, 1805-1873)
- Patricia Vickers-Rich (United States / Australia, 1944- )
- Emily H. Vokes (United States, 1930- )
- Alexander von Volborth (Russia, 1800-1876)
- Giovanni Serafino Volta (Italy, 1764-1842)
- Nadejda Voronets, (Russian, 1881–1979)
- Elisabeth Vrba (United States, 1942- )
- Vishnu-Mittre (India, 1924-1991)

== W ==
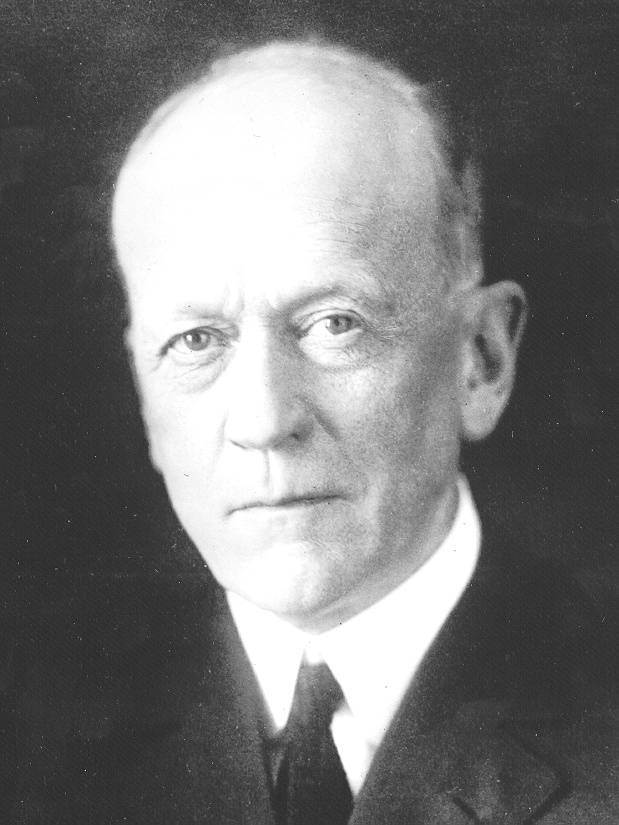
Charles Doolittle Walcott

- Charles Wachsmuth (United States, 1829-1896)
- C. H. Waddington (England, 1905-1975)
- Mary Wade (Australia, 1928-2005)
- Peter J. Wagner (United States, 1964- )
- Norman Arthur Wakefield (Australia, 1918-1972)
- Charles Doolittle Walcott (United States, 1850-1927)
- Alick Walker (England, 1925-1999)
- Cyril Walker (England, 1939-2009)
- Arthur Bache Walkom (Australia, 1889-1976)
- Xiaoming Wang (China / United States)
- Wang Yuan (China)
- Jindřich Wankel (Czech Republic, 1821-1897)
- David Ward (England, 1948- )
- Peter Ward (United States, 1949- )
- Matt J. Wedel (United States)
- Wesley Wehr (United States, 1929-2004)
- David B. Weishampel (United States, 1952- )
- Samuel Paul Welles (United States, 1907-1997)
- John W. Wells (United States, 1907-1994)
- Lars Werdelin (Sweden, 1955- )
- Richard Gilbert West (England, 1926-2020)
- Charles M. Wheatley (United States, 1822-1882)
- Charles Abiathar White (United States, 1826-1910)
- Joseph Frederick Whiteaves (England / Canada, 1835-1909)
- Harry B. Whittington (England, 1916-2010)
- Christopher H. Whittle (United States, 1959- )
- Joan Wiffen (New Zealand, 1922-2009)
- Paul Wignall (England, 1964- )
- James Steele Williams (United States, 1896-1957)
- Samuel Wendell Williston (United States, 1851-1918)
- Alice Wilson (Canada, 1881-1964)
- Jeffrey A. Wilson (United States)
- Carl Wiman (Sweden, 1867-1944)
- Tiberius Cornelis Winkler (Netherlands, 1822-1897)
- Henry Witham (England, 1779-1844)
- Lawrence Witmer (United States)
- Mark P. Witton (England)
- Jack A. Wolfe (United States, 1936-2005)
- Searles Valentine Wood (England, 1798-1880)
- Henry Woods (England, 1868-1952)
- Arthur Smith Woodward (England, 1864-1944)
- Henry Woodward (England, 1832-1921)
- Amos Henry Worthen (United States, 1813-1888)
- Trevor H. Worthy (New Zealand, 1957- )
- Claud William Wright (England, 1917-2010)
- Thomas Wright (Scotland, 1809-1884)
- Andre Wyss (United States)

== X ==
- Xu Xing (China)

== Y ==
- Hisakatsu Yabe (Japan, 1878-1969)
- Yang Zhongjian (China, 1897-1979)
- Lorenzo Gordin Yates (United States, 1837-1909)
- Ivan Yefremov (Russia, 1908-1972)
- Xiaobo Yu (China)

== Z ==
- Mikhail Zalessky (Russia, 1877-1946)
- Lindsay Zanno (United States)
- Otto Zdansky (Austria, 1894-1988)
- Charles René Zeiller (France, 1847-1915)
- Zhao Xijin (China)
- Vladimir Zherikhin (Russia)
- Zhou Ming-Zhen (China, 1918-1996)
- Zhou Zhonghe (China, 1965- )
- Jiri Zidek (Czech Republic / United States)
- Eduard Meine van Zinderen-Bakker (Netherlands / South Africa, 1907-2002)
- Gustav Adolf Zwanziger (Austria, 1837-1893)

== See also ==
- List of geologists
