= Quiring =

Quiring may refer to:

- Quiring Township, Beltrami County, Minnesota
- Christopher Quiring (born 1990), German footballer
- Heinrich Quiring (1883–1964), German paleontologist and geologist
