= Frogley =

Frogley is a surname. Notable people with the surname include:

- Michael Frogley, palaeoecologist
- Roger Frogley (1908–1974), British motorcycle speedway rider
