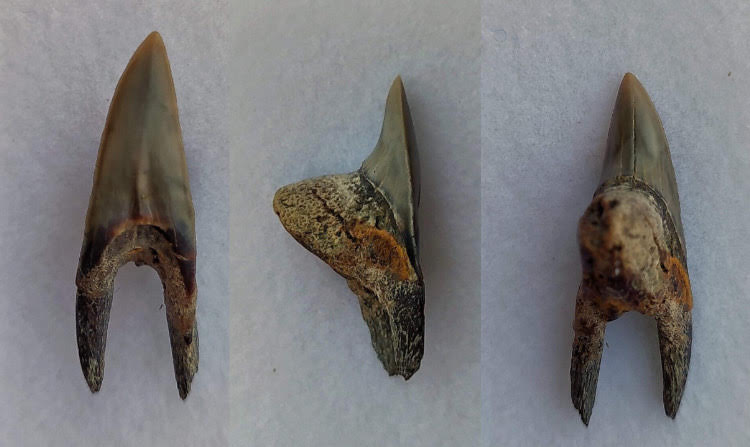
- Teeth of P. macrorhiza

Scientific classification
- Kingdom: Animalia
- Phylum: Chordata
- Class: Chondrichthyes
- Subclass: Elasmobranchii
- Division: Selachii
- Order: Lamniformes
- Family: †Paraisuridae; Herman, 1979
- Genus: †Paraisurus; Glickman, 1957

Type species
- †Oxyrhina macrorhiza (Pictet & Campiche, 1858)

Species
- †P. compressus Sokolov 1978; †P. macrorhiza Pictet and Campiche 1858; †P. amudarjensis? Mertiniene, Nessov & Nazarkin, 1994; †P. lanceolatus Sokolov, 1971; †P. elegans Sokolov, 1978

Synonyms
- Species synonymy: Paraisurus macrorhizus; Oxyrhina macrorhiza Pictet & Campiche, 1858 Paraisurus compressus; Paraisurus amudarjensis? Mertinienė, Nessov, & Nazarkin, 1994

= Paraisurus =

Paraisurus Temporal range: Aptian-Albian

Extinct genus of sharks

Paraisurus is an extinct genus of mackerel sharks that lived during the Cretaceous period. It contains four valid species, which have been found in Europe, Asia, North America, and Australia. A fifth species, P. amudarjensis, is considered by some paleontologists a possible synonym of P. compressus, but is debated. While this genus is mostly known from isolated teeth, an associated dentition of P. compressus was found in the Weno Formation of Texas. It went extinct around the Albian-Cenomanian boundary, as a supposed Coniacian occurrence of "P. sp." is likely a misidentified pseudoscapanorhynchid.
