= Ishijima =

Ishijima (written: 石島 lit. "stone island") is a Japanese surname. Notable people with the surname include:

- Wataru Ishijima (石島 渉, 1906–1980), Japanese paleontologist and geologist
- Yusuke Ishijima (石島 雄介, born 1984), Japanese volleyball player

== Fictional characters ==
- Domon Ishijima (石島 土門), a character in the manga series Flame of Recca
- Strong Ishijima (ストロング石島, Sutorongu Ishijima), a character in the anime series Yu-Gi-Oh! Arc-V
