= Trevor Valle =

American paleontologist and biologist

- Born: October 27, 1975 (age 50); Los Angeles, California, United States
- Known for: Paleontology lab supervisor at the La Brea Tar Pits
- Scientific career
- Fields: Paleontology
- Institutions: Natural History Museum of Los Angeles County

Trevor Valle (born 27 October 1975) is a well known American paleontologist and wildlife biologist specializing in Pleistocene megafauna (specifically mammoths) and reptiles of Southern California. In addition to his extensive career in paleontology he has also served as personality on several notable paleontology and wildlife television programs and documentaries.

Some of Valle's most notable appearances in the media were: Dirty Jobs (2009), Ice Age: Dawn of the Dinosaurs (2009), Mysteries at the Museum (2010), Life After People (2010, 2011), Big History (2013), Doomsday: 10 Ways The World Will End (2016), and National Geographic's Mammoths Unearthed (2015). One of his more recognized appearances came when he was a guest of The Joe Rogan Experience podcast in 2014 and 2016. During his 2016 appearance he debunked numerous dinosaur conspiracy theories. Shortly after he made his appearance, Valle made public statements that he was embarrassed of the appearances, and is staunchly opposed to the "Transphobes. Racists. Pseudoscientists. Anti-scientists. Anti-Semitics. Holocaust deniers. Sexists. Conspiracists." he states are given a platform on the podcast.

Throughout Valle's long paleontology career he has worked with the Natural History Museum of Los Angeles County and other non-profit organizations in Southern California. He has been on numerous digs throughout the United States, Siberia, and South America. He is currently a part-time mitigation paleontologist, assisting in the finding and recovery of fossils from construction sites throughout California. Most recently, he has moved his career into being an FAA-licensed drone pilot.

On 20 October 2020, Valle live-tweeted from Los Angeles during his experience of having a hemorrhagic stroke caused by a brain tumor. His mobility on his right-side, as well as his speech, were affected.

Valle was most recently seen on S7 E4 ("Crowd Control") of the Dropout series GameChanger.

== Media ==
=== Television and film ===
Year	Work	Role	Notes
2009	Dirty Jobs	Himself	
2009	Ice Age: Dawn of the Dinosaurs	Himself	
2009– 2010	Attack of the Show!	Himself	
2010	Mysteries at the Museum	Himself	
2010– 2011	Life After People	Himself	
2011	History of the World in 2 Hours	Himself	
2013	Titans of the Ice Age	Himself	
2013	Ice Age Giants	Himself	
2013	Big History	Himself	Co-host and narrator
2013	Career Day	Himself	
2014	Secrets of the Earth	Himself	
2016	Doomsday: 10 Ways the World Will End	Himself	

=== Podcasts ===
Year	Podcast	Notes
2013	The Mutant Season	
2014	The Joe Rogan Experience	Discussed fossil hunting in Siberia
2016– 2017	The Science Enthusiast	Himself — Host
2016	The Joe Rogan Experience	Debunked internet conspiracy theories
2018	Kalyn's Coffee Talk	
2019	The Common Descent	
2019	The NonSequitur Show	
2019	The Hey Human Podcast	
2020	Paulogia	"Young Earth, Juvenile Science" episode
2020	The ShannonQ Podcast	Debunking "Dinosaurs Didn't Exist" pseudoscience
2020	The Blaney Philosophy	
2020	Modern-Day Debate	Argued against the motion, "Are Dinosaurs Fake?"

== See also ==
- List of paleontologists
