= Charrier =

Charrier is a French surname. Notable people with the surname include:

- Anne Charrier (born 1974), French actress
- Cécile Charrier (born 1983), French neuroscientist researcher
- Charly Charrier (born 1986), French footballer
- Fernando Charrier (1931–2011), Italian Roman Catholic bishop
- Jacques Charrier (1936–2025), French actor, film producer, painter and ceramist
- René Charrier (born 1951), French footballer
- Reynaldo Charrier (born 1945), Chilean geologist
