= Constantino Mpodozis =

Chilean geologist

- Education: University of Chile
- Known for: Contributions to the geology of Chile
- Awards: Medalla “Juan Brüggen” (1994)
- Scientific career
- Fields: Tectonics, Economic geology, Structural geology
- Workplaces: University of Chile

Constantino Mpodozis Marin is a Chilean geologist known for his contributions to the economic geology, magmatic activity and tectonics of Chile. As of 2015 he was executive of Antofagasta Minerals. He has been a member of the Chilean Academy of Sciences since 2009.
