= Beatriz Levi =

Chilean mining engineer (1930–2022)

- Born: 6 April 1930; Milan, Italy
- Died: 22 January 2022 (aged 91); Stockholm, Sweden
- Occupations: Geologist; mining engineer
- Spouse: José Valenzuela
- Partner: Jan Nyström
- Children: 2
- Awards: Guggenheim Fellowship (1970); Medalla “Juan Brüggen” (1988)

Academic background
- Education: University of Chile; University of California at Berkeley
- Thesis: Cretaceous volcanic rocks from a part of the Coast Range west from Santiago, Chile: A study in lithologic variation and burial metamorphism in the Andean Geosyncline (1968)
- Doctoral advisor: Francis John Turner

Academic work
- Discipline: Mining engineering
- Institutions: University of Chile; CORFO; Stockholm University

Beatriz Levi Dresner (6 April 1930 – 22 January 2022) was a Chilean mining engineer. A refugee from Benito Mussolini's fascist regime, she became interested in earth sciences as a student at the University of Chile School of Engineering and became one of Chile's first woman mining engineers. She later worked for CORFO and, due to the 1973 Chilean coup d'état, later fled to Sweden, where she became part of the Stockholm University faculty.

== Biography ==
She was born on 6 April 1930 in Milan, Italy, from an italian-Jewish family who immigrated to Chile in 1939 due to Benito Mussolini's fascist regime. Originally living in Valparaiso and educated at Liceo de Niñas de Viña del Mar, she later moved to Santiago, where she was educated at Liceo 3. While educated at the University of Chile School of Engineering, she became interested in earth sciences as a student of Jorge Muñoz Cristi and studied mining engineering and geology, eventually obtaining her mining engineering degree there in 1958 and becoming one of Chile's first woman mining engineers. While educated at the University of California at Berkeley, she became Chile's first geoscientist to get an overseas PhD; her dissertation, Cretaceous volcanic rocks from a part of the Coast Range west from Santiago, Chile: A study in lithologic variation and burial metamorphism in the Andean Geosyncline (1968) was supervised by Francis John Turner.

After joining CORFO's Mining and Fuels Department, she worked for the Geological Research Institute, where she worked on a geological survey map and was head of their Petrography Laboratory. In 1964, she became the first woman to be a board member of the Chilean Institute of Mining Engineers. In 1970, she was awarded a Guggenheim Fellowship for "studies in igneous and metamorphic petrology". She was awarded the 1988 Medalla al Mérito "Juan Brüggen" for services to Chilean geology and elected honorary member of the Chilean Institute of Mining Engineers in 1994.

She moved to the University of Chile Department of Geology in 1967, where she became a research professor of geology and an expert in the Fedoroff plate. She started studying magmatism and plate tectonics in Central Chile in the early-1970s, and she worked as head of the IIG's Exploration Department from 1971 to 1973 as part of the Allende presidency's nationalization of the copper mines and in 1974 started their Andean Geology academic journal. After she fled Chile due to the 1973 Chilean coup d'état (she was an Allende supporter), she taught at a Costa Rica university on a research grant and eventually settled in Sweden, where she became part of the Stockholm University faculty and met her life partner until her death, geologist Jan Nyström. Despite remaining in Sweden until her death, she continued doing research in her native Chile and collaborating with other Chilean researchers, "all this at a time when funding for scientific research in Chile was extremely difficult".

She had two children with her husband José Valenzuela: a daughter, Silvana; and a son, José Joaquín Valenzuela Levi, a militant who was killed in the Operation Albania massacre in 1987. She and her husband traveled around the world out of an interest in ancient civilizations.

She died on 22 January 2022 in Stockholm.
