= Colegio de Geólogos =

Colegio de Geólogos is a professional association of Chilean geologists. Colegio de Geólogos awards since 1985 and every 3 years the Medalla al Mérito “Juan Brüggen”.

Its recipients are:

- Francisco Hervé (1985)
- Beatriz Levi Dresner (1988)
- Carlos Llaumett (1991)
- Constantino Mpodozis (1994)
- Luis Aguirre Le-Bert (1997)
- Reynaldo Charrier (2000)
- Guillermo Chong (2003)
- Francisco Ortiz Olivares (2006)
- Estanislao Godoy (2009)
- Ernesto Pérez d'Angelo (2012)
- Hugo Moreno Roa (2015)
- Anibal Gajardo Cubillos (2018)
