= J. Alan Holman =

American paleontologist (1931–2006)

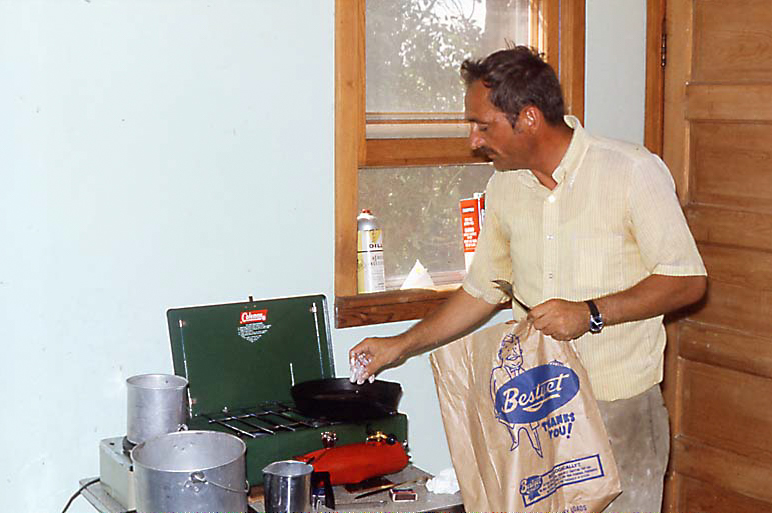
- Alan Holman cooks dinner for the crew of his Wakeeney, Kansas dig, 1974.
- Born: 1931
- Died: 2006 (aged 74–75)

J. Alan Holman (1931–2006) was an American paleontologist, herpetologist, professor and Michigan State University Museum curator well known for his 1995 work called Pleistocene Amphibians and Reptiles in North America which was published by Oxford Press. He graduated from Franklin College, Franklin, Indiana in 1953 with a degree of "Distinction in Biology" and a passion for research and field work. He went on to earn his MS and PhD degrees from the University of Florida at Gainesville in 1957 and 1961, respectively. Holman spent his career as an educator and researcher. He was named Emeritus Professor of Geological Sciences and Zoology and Emeritus Curator of Vertebrate Paleontology at Michigan State University after retiring in 1997.

He authored more than 260 publications in paleoherpetology, herpetology, and vertebrate paleontology and is considered the leading authority of New World fossil snakes. Holman authored twelve books, including two monographs (Pleistocene Amphibians; Reptiles in North America; Pleistocene Amphibians; Reptiles in Britain and Europe) and field guides, such as: Michigan Snakes, Michigan Turtles, Lizards, Michigan Frogs, Toads and Salamanders. The book, The Michigan Roadside Naturalist, was co-authored with Margaret B. "Peg" Holman, his wife. His accomplishment include, Honorary Lifetime membership in the Society of Vertebrate Paleontology. Holman died at his cottage in Fife Lake, MI on August 12, 2006.

Holman died before finishing his new book, The Amphibians and Reptiles of Michigan. His colleague and friend, Jim Harding, helped complete some details so the book could be published. The Amphibians and Reptiles of Michigan, which includes 54 creatures, was included on the 2013 list of Michigan Notable Books—20 Michigan oriented books that include photography, poetry, memoirs, novels and reference works.

== Gallery ==
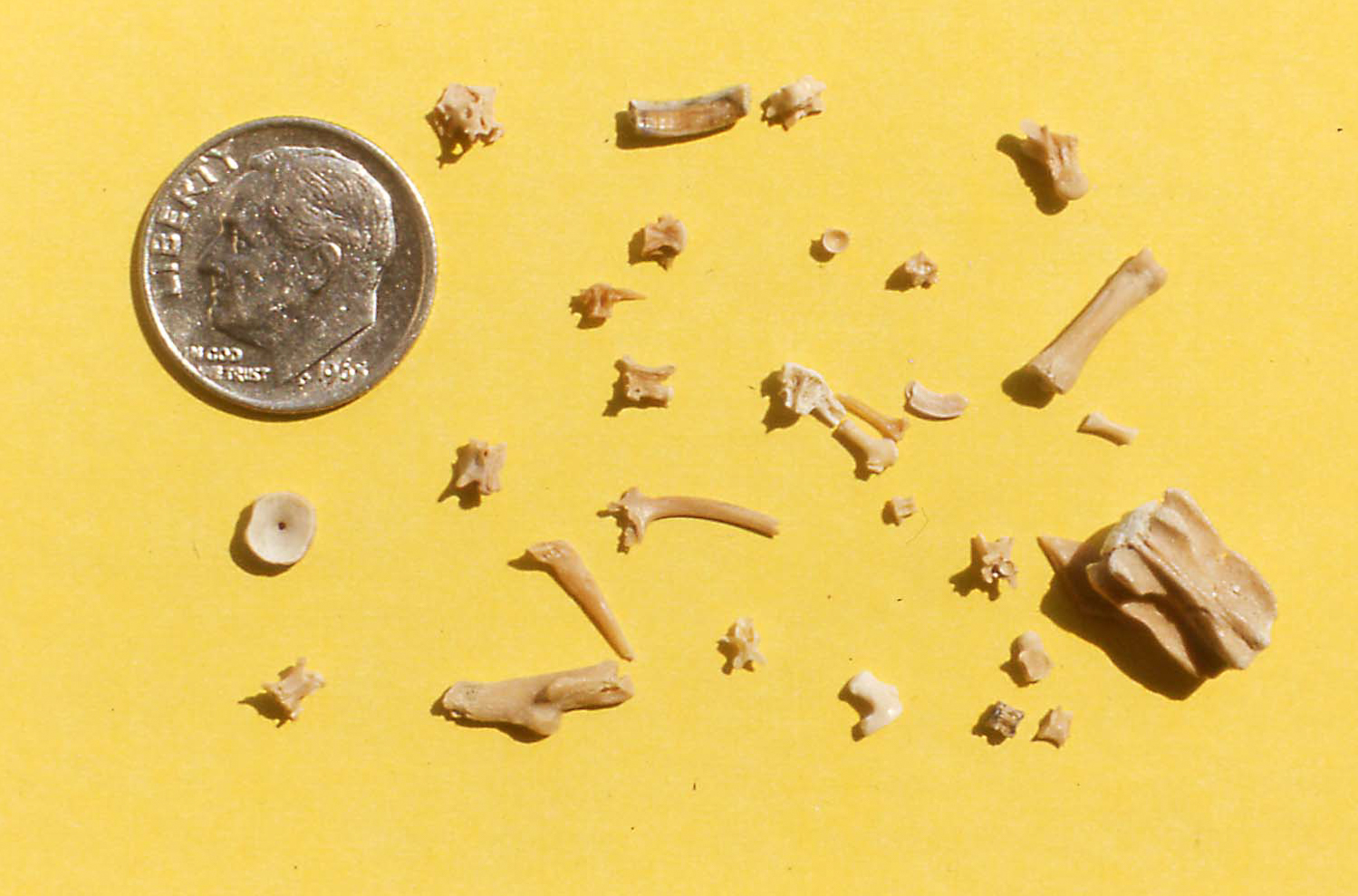
Holman Dig 08

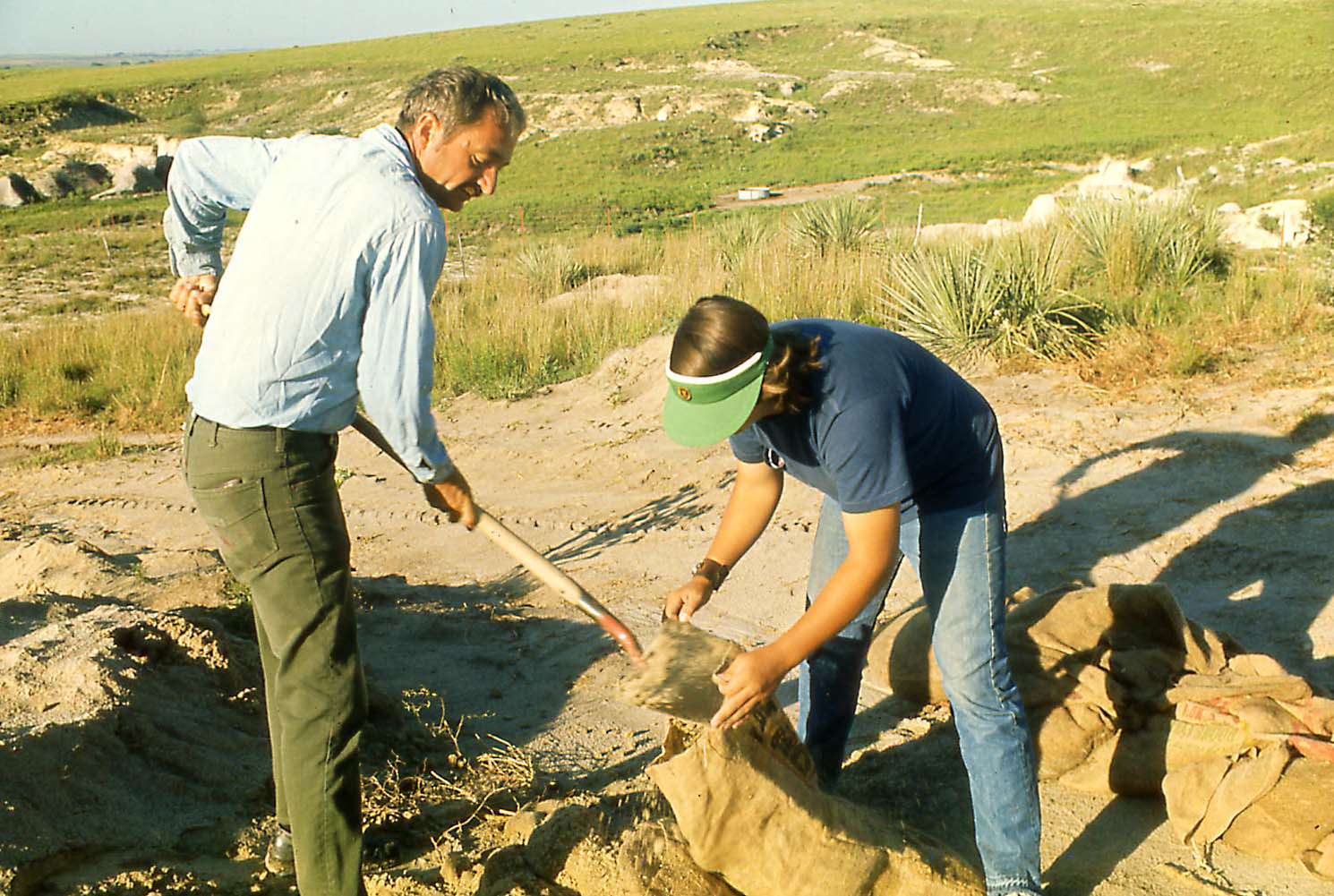
Holman Dig 02

== See also ==
- List of paleontologists
- Paleontology in Michigan
