= Hugo Moreno Roa =

Chilean geologist

- Education: University of Chile
- Known for: Study of Chilean volcanoes
- Awards: Medalla “Juan Brüggen” (2015)
- Scientific career
- Fields: Volcanology
- Workplaces: National Geology and Mining Service; Southern Andean Volcano Observatory

Hugo Moreno Roa is a Chilean geologist known for his studies of Chilean volcanoes. In 2015 he was awarded the prize Medalla “Juan Brüggen” by Colegio de Geólogos.
