= Zeev Reiss =

Israeli micropaleontologist and geologist (1917–1996)

Zeev Reiss, (Hebrew: זאב רייס; April 2, 1917 - July 11, 1996) was an Israeli micropaleontologist and geologist, whose career included positions in government service and academia. He studied biology and medical sciences at the University of Cernăuţi, Bukovina, which was then part of Romania. He could not finish his studies at the university due to Nazi occupation and imprisonment. After World War II, he administered a health department for Holocaust survivors in Displaced Person camps under the American Forces in Munich.

Reiss immigrated to Israel in 1949. He took up studies toward a degree in Geology and Paleontology at Hebrew University. After receiving his Ph.D., Reiss was given the responsibility to establish a micropaleontology and stratigraphy laboratory in the Israel Geological Survey, where he became chief micropaleontologist and Director of the Paleontology Division.
