= Reynaldo Charrier =

Chilean geologist

- Education: University of Chile
- Known for: Contributions to the geology of Chile
- Awards: Medalla “Juan Brüggen” (2000)
- Scientific career
- Fields: Tectonostratigraphy, Tectonics, Paleogeography, Structural geology
- Workplaces: University of Chile; Free University of Berlin

Reynaldo Charrier (born 1945) is a Chilean geologist who has contributed to the tectonostratigraphy of Chile. In 2000 he received the award "Premio Juan Brüggen".
