= Rosalvina Rivera =

Peruvian palaeontologist

Rosalvina Rivera (1914–2011) was a Peruvian palaeontologist who dedicated her entire life to studying geology in Peru. She was the first woman in Peru to receive a PhD in geology.

Rivera graduated with a bachelor's degree in Geological Sciences from the National University of San Marcos (UNMSM) and, in 1951, presented her doctoral thesis on fossils from the town of Puente Inga in Lima, located near the outflow of the Chillon River. She studied Cretaceous ammonites, Tertiary molluscs and charophytes between 1947 and 1961. It was an outstanding achievement for Peruvian women, who were forbidden to study at the university and even a more scientific discipline at that time. She won two post-doctoral study grants in Palaeontology and Stratigraphy from the U.S. Geological Survey and Stanford University, California, US. After working for twelve years for the Geological Institute of Peru and its successor National Institute for Mining Research and Development, Rivera worked for the company Cerro de Pasco Petroleum Corporation doing palaeontology and stratigraphy work for six years.

Rivera's career included consulting for mining exploration companies and becoming a professor, first at the UNMSM and then at the National University of Engineering (UNI) until her retirement in 1974.

Among Rivera's achievements are the organization of the UNI Museum of Palaeontology (with fossils from Peru and abroad), the creation of the Stratigraphic Lexique of Peru (including a collection of geological maps) and her performance as the first president of the Geological Society of Peru.

A record of her studies is stored in the repository of the Geological, Mining and Metallurgical Institute (Peruvian Geological Survey) and the Library of the Peruvian Geological Society.

== Selected work ==
Rivera, R. (1956). Lexique stratigraphique international, Amérique Latine, Perú. Vol. V, fasc. 5-b, Congr. Inter. Geol., México. 1957.
