= Big History (TV series) =

American television documentary series

- Genre: Entertainment
- Narrated by: Bryan Cranston
- Country of origin: United States
- Original language: English

Production
- Running time: 30 minutes 2 hour final episode

Original release
- Network: H2
- Release: November 2 – December 28, 2013

Big History is an American television documentary series narrated by Bryan Cranston, which originally aired on H2 in 2013. It won the 35th Annual News & Documentary Emmy Award for Outstanding Graphic Design and Art Direction.

Each episode covers a single topic from history and shows connections between that topic and various fields of science and social science. Sixteen half-hour episodes aired in the first season, followed by a two-hour finale drawing connections between the sixteen topics. The series has been criticized by Media Life Magazine for its factual inaccuracies.

The series takes its title from a coinage by David Christian who describes Big History as an emerging academic discipline and approach to history that is less interested in wars and monarchs than it is in the way events are connected thematically and even molecularly, back to the Big Bang.

== List of Big History episodes ==
No.	Title	Original air date	Summary
1	"The Superpower of Salt"	November 2, 2013	Just as we can't live without food, water, and air, so too do we need salt to survive. Salt is part of our chemistry that makes up our body, especially our brain. Our need for salt has determined the location of the first cities, built monuments like the Erie Canal and the Great Wall of China, and sparked revolutions in France and India. In England, salt-producing towns have names ending in "wich" such as Greenwich.
2	"Horse Power Revolution"	November 2, 2013	The horse is one of the most unique creatures in the world. Its nature gave it the ability to run long distance, and made it easy for man to domesticate. Once it became domesticated it revolutionized the size of empires, the languages we speak, and the clothes we wear.
3	"Gold Fever"	November 9, 2013	Humans are hard-wired to desire for shiny things, such as water and gold. Gold's unique properties make it the most shiny metal in the world, and prevents it from corroding. Humanity's lust for gold has driven them to cross oceans in search of it. In the late 1840s, James W. Marshall and his business partner John Sutter try to keep their discovery of gold in California a secret.
4	"Below Zero"	November 9, 2013	Cold has shaped the Universe and humanity in many ways, from the creation of stars to the color of your skin. While warm areas have produced civilizations, cold areas have produced barbarians. Frederic Tudor sets up the ice trade in the early 1800s in the Boston area.
5	"Megastructures"	November 16, 2013	The biology and emotions of human beings have given them a desire to build massive structures, from the Great Pyramid of Giza to the Empire State Building. This is also a reflection of the basic principle embedded in the structure of the Universe.
6	"Defeating Gravity"	November 16, 2013	Without the right kind of air and the perfect materials flight would be impossible. But Earth has the perfect ingredients for flight, from birds and bug to planes and helicopters. In the 1700s, the Montgolfier brothers fly with hot-air balloons in France. In the 1800s in England, George Cayley designs gliders. Next, in 1852, Henri Giffard invents an airship with an imperfect engine.
7	"World of Weapons"	November 23, 2013	With small teeth and no claws humans are vulnerable. But with our bodies, such as throwing arms, and the right material, such as ancient bat poop, humans are able to make weapons for hunting and warfare. At the Battle of Crécy (1346), the longbow is the secret weapon of the English.
8	"Brain Boost"	November 23, 2013	
9	"Mountain Machines"	November 30, 2013	The Donner Party are migrating westward across the Sierras in the 1840s. Ötzi the Iceman was probably looking for metal in the Alps Mountains over 3,000 years ago.
10	"Pocket Time Machine"	November 30, 2013	
11	"Decoded"	December 7, 2013	The ancient Egyptians use a wavy line called Mem to represent water. During World War II, the Lorenz cipher turned letters into numbers. In Britain, Colossus was the name of an artificial brain.
12	"Deadly Meteors"	December 7, 2013	Meteors are "space rocks" while comets are "ice chunks." The 2013 meteor explosion in Russia was approximately 55 feet while, but it was 30 times more powerful than the Hiroshima atomic bomb (according to the narrator Bryan Cranston).
13	"The Sun"	December 14, 2013	
14	"Rise of the Carnivores"	December 14, 2013	Aurochs were more ferocious than today's bulls. The Rinderpest virus became a major threat to the cattle population.
15	"H_{2}O"	December 21, 2013	Water causes unprecedented destruction in the 2011 tsunami in Japan. After the 1846–1860 cholera pandemic, London builds the first water sewer system.
16	"Silver Supernova"	December 21, 2013	Silver kills germs. Supernovas produce silver as stars explode. On the other hand, supernovas don't make gold which explains why gold is rarer than silver; the supernovas of neutron stars is an exception because they also make gold. The mines of Laurion near ancient Athens contain lots of silver. Around 480 BCE, the Greeks use silver to pay their men and build warships. Thaler was the name of the silver coin in the Holy Roman Empire's Czech region. Today, the English word "dollar" is derived from "thaler." Spanish conquerors found lots of silver near Potosí.
17	"The Big History of Everything"	December 28, 2013	Abiogenesis gives rise to the first life forms: bacteria. The Alpide belt stretches across two continents: from the Himalayas to the Alps.

== Emmy Award ==
The 35th Annual News & Documentary Emmy Award for Outstanding Graphic Design and Art Direction was awarded to the team of Flight 33 Productions:

Creative Director Steffen Schlachtenhaufen

Art Directors Dominique Navarro, Chris Ramirez

Visual Effects Supervisors Matt Drummond, Christopher Gaal, John R. McConnell

Compositors Dean Guiliotis, Carter Higgins, Brad Moylan, Ian Pauly

Lead 3D Visual Effects Artist Michael Ranger

3D Artist Scott Bell, Jennie Bozic, Keith Yakouboff, Sebastiano D’Aprile, Mario Cardona

Lead FX Artist Nico Sugleris
