= Anne Dambricourt-Malassé =

French paleoanthropologist (born 1959)

- Born: 1959 (age 66–67); Paris, France
- Education: Paris-Sud 11 University
- Scientific career
- Fields: Paleoanthropology
- Workplaces: CNRS

Dr Anne Dambricourt-Malassé (born 1959) is a paleoanthropologist at the French National Centre for Scientific Research (CNRS). She has advocated a highly controversial non-Darwinian view of human evolution with theories similar to punctuated equilibrium, auto-organization and dissipative structures, with natural selection not being the exclusive method of evolution.

== Life and career ==
She studied geology at the Paris-Sud 11 University in Orsay, in the south of Paris. She took a PhD in 1987 at the Institute of Human Paleontology, a Foundation Prince Albert 1er of Monaco, associated with the Muséum national d'histoire naturelle (National Museum of Natural History) in Paris. Her PhD thesis was on human embryonic origins of permanent bipedalism, she is accredited to Direct Research Cum Magna Laude since 2011.

As paleontologist, her controversial views on human origins come from homeobox genes and punctated equilibria included in her work, whereas paradigm explains permanent bipedalism as the result of gradual post-natal adaptations from arboreal environment to open savanna.

She joined CNRS in 1990, working with Henry de Lumley. Since 1988 she has worked with orthodontists to study unexpected prevalences of malocclusion in children. She has studied changes in the sphenoid bone in the skull closely linked to the embryonic process of neurulation and neural crest migration.

In 2005, the documentary series ''Homo Futurus'': the Inside Story with the scientific direction of eminent paleoanthropologist Phillip Tobias, featured her ideas on how man evolved. Her ideas on how evolution took place have come from comparative studies of fossils and embryology.
