= Lukas Hottinger =

Lukas Hottinger (25 February 1933, Düsseldorf – 4 September 2011, Basel) was a paleontologist, biologist and geologist. Hottinger collaborated with the Natural History Museum of Basel (Switzerland).

Hottinger was one of the major experts on present-day and fossil larger foraminifera. In 1997 he obtained the Cushman Award from the Cushman Foundation for Foraminiferal Research (Journal of Foraminiferal Research, vol. 28/1, 1–2) for his lifetime contributions to foraminiferal research. Professor Hottinger completed his PhD thesis on Paleocene and Eocene Alveolina in 1959 under the direction of Professor Manfred Reichel. His thesis on Paleogene Alveolina included genus and species definitions and changes through time, the concept of phylogenetic lineages, and their use in zonal biochronology. Published as a double volume of Mémoires Suisse de Paléontologie in 1960, this remains the authoritative work on these unique foraminifera. From 1959 to 1964 he lived in Morocco working for the geological survey under the direction of Georges Choubert and Anne Faure-Muret, a time that was essential for his formation. His bibliography, widely respected by the international scientific community, comprises over 120 papers and six monographs. These contributions range far over the geological landscape, including topics as diverse as stratigraphy, paleoecology, and evolution, and spanning the globe from Indo-Pacific and Africa to the northeast Atlantic and the Mediterranean Sea. Besides being a member of the Swiss Academy of Natural Sciences, in 1993 Professor Hottinger was honored with membership in the Slovenian Academy of Sciences and Arts, and in 1997 was awarded the Doctor Honoris Causa by the Universidad Autonoma de Barcelona (Spain).

== Some references ==
'Bibliography 1959–1990 (selected). Since 1991 complete, selection with ‡'

- Hottinger, L, 1960. Über eocaene und paleocaene Alveolinen. Eclogae geologicae Helvetiae, vol. 53, no. 1, pp. 265–283.
- Hottinger, L. und Schaub, H. 1960. Zur Stufeneinteilung des Paleocaens und des Eocaens. Einführung der Stufen Ilerdien und Biarritzien. Eclogae geologicae Helvetiae vol. 53, no. 1, pp. 453–479.
- Hottinger, L. 1962. Recherches sur les Alvéolines du Paléocène et de l'Eocène. Mémoires Suisses de Palèontologie 75/76, 243 p., 117 figs. & 18 pls.
- Hottinger, L. 1963. Les Alvéolines paléogènes. exemple d'un genre polyphylétique. in: E. Von Koenigswald (ed.): Evolutionary trends in Foraminifera. Elsevier (Amsterdam), pp. 298 – 314.
- Hottinger, L. and Dreher, D. 1974. Differentiation of protoplasm in Nummulitidae (Foraminifera) from Elat, Red Sea. Marine Biology vol. 25, pp. 41 – 61.
- Hottinger, L. 1976. An early Umbilical Canal System in Trocholina chouberti n. sp. from the Lower Cretaceous of North-Eastern Morocco. Eclogae geologicae Helvetiae vol. 69, no. 3, pp. 815 – 520.
- Hottinger, L. 1978. Comparative anatomy of selected foraminiferal shell structures. In: R.H. Headley and G. Adams (ed.) Foraminifera III. Academic press (London), pp. 203–266.
- Billman, H., Hottinger, L. and Oesterle, H. 1980. Neogene to Recent Rotaliid Foraminiferans from Indonesia. In: L. Hottinger (ed,) Rotaliid Foraminifera. Mémoires Suisses de Paléontologie, vol. 101. Birkhäuser (Basel), pp. 71–113.
- Hottinger, L. and Drobne, K. 1980. Early Tertiary conical imperforate foraminifera. Razprave (Ljubljiana) vol.22, no.3, pp. 169 – 276, 15 figs, 32 pls.
- Hottinger, L. 1981. Fonctions de la disposition alternante des loges chez les foraminifères et lastructure d'Omphalocyclus. Cahiers de Micropaléontologie Année 1981/4 (Paris), pp. 45 – 55.
- Hottinger, L. 1982. Larger Foraminifera, giant cells with a historical background. Naturwissenschaften, vol. 69, pp. 361 – 371.
- Hottinger, L. 1983. Neritic macroid genesis, an ecological approach. In: T. Peryt (ed): Coated Grains. Springer (Berlin), pp. 38 – 55.
- Hottinger, L. 1986. Construction, structure and function of foraminiferal shells. In: B. Leadbeater and R. Riding (eds.): Biomineralisation in plants and lower animals. Systematic Association, special vol. 30, Clarendon (Oxford), pp. 219 – 239.
- Hottinger, L. 1988. Conditions for generating carbonate platforms. Memorie Società Geologica Italiana, vol. 40, pp. 265 – 271.
- Hottinger, L., Caus, E. and Drobne, K. 1989. Late Cretaceous larger miliolids (foraminifera) endemic in the Pyrenean faunal province. Facies (Erlangen), vol. 21, pp. 99 –134.
- ‡Hottinger, l., Halicz, E. and Reiss, Z. 1993. Recent Foraminiferida from the Gulf of Aqaba, Red Sea. Slovenska Akademija Znanosti in Umenosti (Ljubljana), classis IV, dela vol. 33, 179 p., 230 pls.
- ‡Hottinger, L. 1996. Focussing Paleontological Education. Europal Newsletter 9: p. 36–39.
- ‡Hottinger, L. 1996. Sels nutritifs et biosédimentation. Mémoires Société géologique de France (n.s.)169: 99–107.
- Tambareau, Y., Hottinger, L., Rodriguez-Lazaro, J. Villatte, J. Babinot, J.-F.. Colin, J.-P., Garcia-Zabraga, E., Rocchia, R. et Guerrero, N. 1997. Communautés fossiles benthiques aux alentours de la limite Crétacé-Tertaire dans les Pyrénées. Bulletin Société géologique France 168/6: 795–804.
- Hollaus, S. and Hottinger, L. 1997. Temperature dependence of endosymbiontic relationships? Evidence from the depth range of mediterranean Amphistegina lessonii (Foraminiferida) truncated by the thermocline. Eclogae geologicae Helvetiae 90/ 3: 591–597.
- ‡Hottinger, L. 1997. Shallow benthic foraminiferal assemblages as signals for depth of their deposition and their limitations. Bulletin Société géologique de France 168/4: 491–505.
- Hottinger, L. 1997. Paleontology, quo vadis? In: Dr. Honoris Causa Lukas Hottinger. Servei Publications Universitat Autònoma de Barcelona (Bellaterra): 13–23.
- Hottinger, L. 1997. The 1997 Joseph A. Cushman Award. https://web.archive.org/web/20120320122533/http://pages.unibas.ch/museum/microfossils/Colls_NMB/COLLECTN/HOTTINGE/CUSHM_AW.HTML
- ‡Serra-Kiel, J., Hottinger, L., Caus, E., Drobne, K., Ferrandez, C., Jauhri, A.K., Less, G., Pavlovec, R., Pignatti, J., Samso, J.M., Schaub, H., Sirel, E., Strougo, A., Tambareau, Y., Tosequella, J. and Zakrevskaya, E. 1998. Larger Foraminiferal Biostratigraphy of the Tethyan Paleocene and Eocene. Bulletin Société géologique France 169/2: 281–299.
- Hottinger. L. 1998. Three levels of abstraction in the study of the fossil record. An introduction to activities within IGCP 287 Early Paleogene Shallow Benthos. Dela SAZU 34/2: 11–14.
- Hottinger, L. 1998. Shallow benthic foraminifera at the Paleocene-Eocene Boundary. Extended abstract. Strata (Toulouse) série 1, vol. 9, pp. 61 – 64.
- Hottinger, L., Sameeni, J. and Butt, A.A. 1998. Emendation of Alveolina vredenburgi Davies and Pinfold, 1937 from the Surghar Range, Pakistan. Dela SAZU 34/2: 155–163.
- ‡Krautwig, D.W.H., Hottinger, L. and Zankl, H. 1998. The Lamellar-Perforate Arborescent and Coloured Foraminifers Miniacina, Homotrema and Sporadotrema. Facies (Erlangen), 38: 89–102.
- ‡Hottinger, L. 1999. Odd partnerships, a particular size relation between close species of larger foraminifera, with an emendation of an outstandingly odd partner, Glomalveolina delicatissima (Smout, 1954), Middle Eocene. Eclogae geologicae Helvetiae 92/3: 385–393.
- Peybernès, B., Fondecave-Wallez, M.-J., Hottinger, L. Eichène, P. et Segonzac, G. 2000. Limite Crétacé-Tertaire et Biozonation micropaléontologique du Danien-Sélandien dans le Béarn occidental et la Haute-Soule (Pyrénées-Atlantiques). Géobios 33/1: 35–48.
- Hottinger, L. 2000. Adaptations of the foraminiferal cell to life in shallow carbonate environments. Extended abstract. Accad. Naz. Sci. Lett. Arti Modena, Collana Studi 21: 135–140.
- ‡Hottinger, L. 2000. Functional morphology of benthic foraminiferal shells, envelopes of cells beyond measure. micropaleontology 46, suppl. 1. 57–86.
- ‡Langer, M. R. and Hottinger L. 2000. Biogeography of selected "larger" foraminifera. micropaleontology 46, suppl. 1: 105–126.
- ‡Hottinger, L. 2001. Archaiasinids and related porcelaneous larger foraminifera from the Late Miocene of the Dominican Republic. Journal of Paleontology 75/3: 475–512.
- ‡Hottinger, L. 2001. Learning from the past. In: Levi-Montalcini R. (ed.) Frontiers of Life, Vol. 4, part 2: Discovery and spoliation of the biosphere, pp. 449–477. 18 figs. 2 tab. Academic Press, London & San Diego.
- ‡Hottinger L. 2001. Shell Cavity Systems in Elphidiid and Pellatispirine bilamellar Foraminifera. Editor's preface. Micropaleontology 47, suppl.2: 1–4.
- ‡Hottinger, L., Reiss, Z. and Langer, M. 2001. Spiral canals of some Elphididae. Micropaleontology 47, suppl. 2: 5–34.
- ‡Hottinger, L., Romero, j. and Caus, E. 2001. Architecture and revision of the pallatispirines, planispiral canaliferous foraminifera from the Late Eocene Tethys. Micropaleontology 47 suppl. 2; 35–77.
- ‡Aguilar, M., Bernaus, J.M., Caus, E. and Hottinger, L. 2002. Lepidorbitoides minima Douvillé from Mexico, a foraminiferal index fossil for the Campanian. Journal Foraminiferal Research 32/2: 126–134.
- ‡Abramovich, S., Keller, G., Adatte, T., Stinnesbeck, W., Hottinger, L:, Stueben, D., Berner, Z., Ramanivosoa, B., & Randriamanantenasoa, A. 2002. Age and Paleoenvironment of the Maestrichtian to Paleocene of the Mahajanga Basin, Madagascar: a multidisciplinary approach. Marine Micropaleontology 47, 17 –70.
- Hottinger, L. 2003. Oligocene Larger Foraminifera, Dusk of the Paleogene or Dawn of the Neogene? In: Davide Bassi (ed.) Oligocene Shallow Water Carbonates: Biogenic Components and Facies. Workshop abstracts. Ann. Università Ferrara Vol 10, suppl., p. 9–10.
- Drobne. K. and Hottinger, L. 2004. Larger Miliolid Foraminifera in Time and Space. Academie Serbe Sciences et Arts, Bulletin T. CXXVIII; Sciences Naturelles No. 42: 83–99.
- Hottinger, L. 2004. Das geologische Riegelhaus: Allschwiler Untergrund in 4 Etagen. Allschwiler Schriften 12 (Kulturverein Allschwil – Schönenbuch), 51p.
- ‡Hottinger, L. 2005. Geometrical constraints in foraminiferal architecture: consequences of change from planispiral to annular growth. Studia geologica polonica 124: 99–115.
- ‡Hottinger, L. 2006. Illustrated glossary of terms used in foraminiferal research. Notebooks on Geology, Brest, Memoir 2006/2, 126 p. 83 figs. Electronic publication: http://paleopolis.rediris.es/cg/uk_index.html_MO2%5B%5D pdf 1–4.
- ‡Hottinger, L. 2006. The "face" of benthic foraminifera. Bolletino della Società Paleontologica Italiana (Modena), 45/1, 75–89.
- ‡Hottinger, L. 2006. The depth-depending ornamentation of some lamellar-perforate foraminifera. Symbiosis vol. 42, pp. 141 –151.
- Bassi, D., Fugagnoli, A. and Hottinger, L. 2006. Foraminiferal shell structures: exoskeleton and endoskeleton (part 1). Foraminiferal shell structures: additional cavity systems produced by supplemental skeletons (part 2). Annali Università degli Studi di Ferrara, Sezione Museologia Scientifica e Naturalistica, Vol. 2, parts 1–2. Electronic publication: https://web.archive.org/web/20080408025807/http://eprints.unife.it/annali/museologia/vol2.htm
- Workshop on the High Biodiversity of the Gulf of Aqaba (Eilat): Origins, Dimensions and Protection. Institute of Advanced Studies Hebrew University, Jerusalem 2006. Abstract volume:

Hottinger, L. (2006). The significance of biogenous carbonate production in reef ecology and its experimental confirmation by anthropogenous eutrophication in Mauritius, Indian Ocean. Abstract p. 27. Hottinger, L. (2006). Zeev Reiss' contributions to structural analysis and comparative anatomy of the foraminiferan shell. Abstract p. 28

- International symposium on foraminifera FORAMS 2006 (Natal, Brazil). Book of abstracts: Anuario do Instituto de Geosciencias Universidade Federal do Rio de Janeiro (UFRJ), Rio de Janeiro, Vol. 29/1: 735 p.:

Boix, C., Villalonga R. and Hottinger, L. (2006). Rotaliids from the Late Cretaceous Western Tethys. Abstract. Anurario do Instituto deGeosciencias – UFRJ, 29/1: 677. Hottinger, L. (2006). Scales in space, time and taxonomy in the research for the history of life. Abstract. Anuario do Instituto de Geosciencias- UFRJ 29/1: 682–683. Hottinger, L. and Caus, E. (2006). Meandropsinids, an ophthalmidid family of Late Cretaceous K-strategists endemic in the Pyrenean Gulf. Abstract. Anuario do Instituto de Geosciencias UFRJ 29/1: 684–685. Hottinger, L., Tyszka, J., and Topa, P. (2006). "Glossary" and "e-Forams": free, rapid access to the current basic knowledge on foraminifera. Abstract. Anuario do Instituto de Geosciencias 29/1: 385 -386.

Ornelas-Sanchez, M. and Hottinger, L. (2006). Upper Jurassic Lituolids in the Sierra de Chiapas (Mexico) and their relation to the Tethys. Abstract. Anuario do Instituto de Geosciencias – UFRJ, 29/1: 351–352.

Vicedo, V., Hottinger, L., Caus, E. and Aguilar, M. (2006). Fusiform and laterally compressed alveolinids from both sides of the Late Cretaceous Atlantic. Abstract. Anuario do Instituto de Geosciencias – UFRJ, 29/1: 695–696.

- Hottinger, L. 2007. The Lockhartia Sea, center of K-strategist foraminiferal diversity in the Neotethys during the Eocene and its eastward displacement in later times. Abstract. 1st International Paleobiogeography Symposium, Paris (Université Pierre et Marie Curie, Paris 6), p. 48.
- ‡Vecchio, E., Barattolo, F. and Hottinger, L. 2007. Alveolina horizons in the Trentinara Formation (Southern Apennines, Italy): stratigraphic and paleogeographic implications. Rivista Italiana Paleontologia e Stratigrafia Vol. 113, no. 1, pp. 21 – 42.
- ‡Bassi, D., Hottinger, L. and Nebelsick, J.H. 2007. Larger foraminifera from the upper Oligocene of the Venetian area, Northern Italy. Paleontology, vol. 50, part 4, pp. 845 – 868.
- ‡Hottinger, L. 2007. Revision of the foraminiferal genus Globoreticulina Rahaghi, 1978, and of its associated fauna of larger foraminifera from the late Middle Eocene of Iran. Notebooks on Geology (Brest), CG2007-A06, pp. 1–51, 3 Figs., 15 Pls.
- ǂHottinger, L. and Caus, E 2007. Shell architecture in the Late Cretaceous foraminiferal subfamily Clypeorbinae Sigal, 1952. Journal of Foraminiferal Research, 37/4, 372–392; doi:10.2113/gsjfr.37.4.372
- ǂBoix, C., Villalonga, R., Caus, E., Hottinger, L. 2009. Late Cretaceous rotaliids (Foraminiferida) from the Western Tethys. Neues Jahrbuch für Geologie und Paläontologie - Abhandlungen, 253(2–3), pp. 197–227(31). doi:10.1127/0077-7749/2009/0253-0197
- ǂVicedo, V., Aguilar, M., Caus, E., Hottinger, L. 2009. Fusiform and laterally compressed alveolinaceans (Foraminiferida) from both sides of the Late Cretaceous Atlantic. Neues Jahrbuch für Geologie und Paläontologie - Abhandlungen, 253(2–3), pp. 229–247(19). doi:10.1127/0077-7749/2009/0253-0229
- ǂHottinger, L., Caus, E. 2009. Meandropsinidae, an ophtalmidid family of Late Cretaceous K-strategist foraminifera endemic in the Pyrenean Gulf. Neues Jahrbuch für Geologie und Paläontologie - Abhandlungen, 253(2–3), pp. 249–279(31). doi:10.1127/0077-7749/2009/0253-0249
- ǂHottinger L. (2009). The Paleocene and earliest Eocene foraminiferal Family Miscellaneidae: neither nummulitids nor rotaliids. Carnets de Géologie/Notebooks on Geology, Brest, Article 2009/06 (CG2009_A06).

== Species and Genera dedicated to Lukas Hottinger ==
- Orbitoides hottingeri van Hinte

Hinte J.E. van 1966. Orbitoides hottingeri n.sp. from Northern Spain. Proc. Konink. Neder. Akad. Wet. Serie B, 69, 388–402.

- Flabellinella hottingeri Rahhali

Rahhali I. 1970. Foraminifères benthoniques et pélagiques du Crétacé supérieur du synclinal d'El Koubbat (Moyen Atlas Maroc). Notes et Mémoires du Service géologique du Maroc, 30 (225), 51–98.

- Hottingerina lukasi Drobne

Drobne K. 1975. Hottingerina lukasi n. gen., n. sp. (Foraminiferida) iz srednjega paleocena v severozahodni Jugoslaviji (Hottingerina lukasi n. gen., n. sp. (Foraminiferida) du Paléocène moyen provennant du Nord-Ouest de la Yougoslavie). Razprave, 4.razr. Slovenska akademija znanosti in umetnosti SAZU 18, 242–253, 10 pls, Ljubljana.

- Alveolina hottingeri Drobne 1977

Drobne K. 1977. Alvéolines paléogènes de la Slovénie et de l’Istrie. Schweizerische Palaontologische Abhandlungen 99, 1–132.

- Pseudolacazina hottingeri n. gen. n. sp. Caus

Caus E. 1979. Fabularia roselli n.sp., et Pseudolacazina n.gen., foraminiferes de I'Eocene moyen du Nord-Est de I'Espagne. Geobios, 12, 29–45.

- Nummulites hottingeri Schaub 1981

Schaub H.P. 1981. Nummulites et Assilines de la Téthys Paléogène: taxonomie, phylogénèse et biostratigraphie. Schweiz Palaeontol Abhand 104–106: 1–236.

- Orbitokathina hottingeri Rahaghi

Rahaghi A. 1983. Stratigraphy and faunal assemblage of Paleocene-Lower Eocene in Iran. Ministry of Oil, National Iranian Oil Companies, Geological Laboratoires, 10, 1–73.

- Spiroplectinella hottingeri Langer 1992

Langer M.R. 1992. New Recent foraminiferal genera and species from the lagoon at Madang, Papua New Guinea. Journal of Micropalaeontology, 11(1): 85–93.

- Yaberinella hottingeri Robinson

Johnson E. 1993. Some imperforate larger foraminifera from the Paleogene of Jamaica and the Nicaragua rise. Journal of Foraminiferal Research, 23, 47–65.

- Praealveolina hottingeri Pêcheux 1996 (?)
- Karsella hottingeri Sirel

Sirel E. 1997. The species of Miscellanea Pfender, 1935 (Foraminiferida) in the Thanetian-Ilerdian sediments in Turkey. Revue de Paleobiologie, 16(1), 77–99.

- Somalina hottingeri White

White M.R. 1997. A new species of Somalina (Somalina hottingeri) with partially vacuolate lateral walls from the Middle Eocene of Oman. Micropalaeontology, 16, 131–135.

- Bopaina hottingeri Colin, Tambareau and Krasheninnikov 1998
- Hottingerina anatolica Sirel 1999

Sirel E. 1999. Four new genera (Haymanella, Kayseriella, Elaziella and Orduella) and one new species of Hottingerina from the Paleocene of Turkey. Micropaleontology, 45 (2), 113–137.

- Streptocyclammina hottingeri Schlagintweit, Gawlick and Lein 2005
