= Allan Bé =

American paleontologist

Allan Wie Hwa Bé
- Born: 1931
- Died: 13 October 1983 (aged 51–52)
- Education: Columbia University
- Scientific career
- Fields: Micropaleontology
- Workplaces: Lamont–Doherty Earth Observatory, Columbia University; Cushman Foundation for Foraminiferal Research

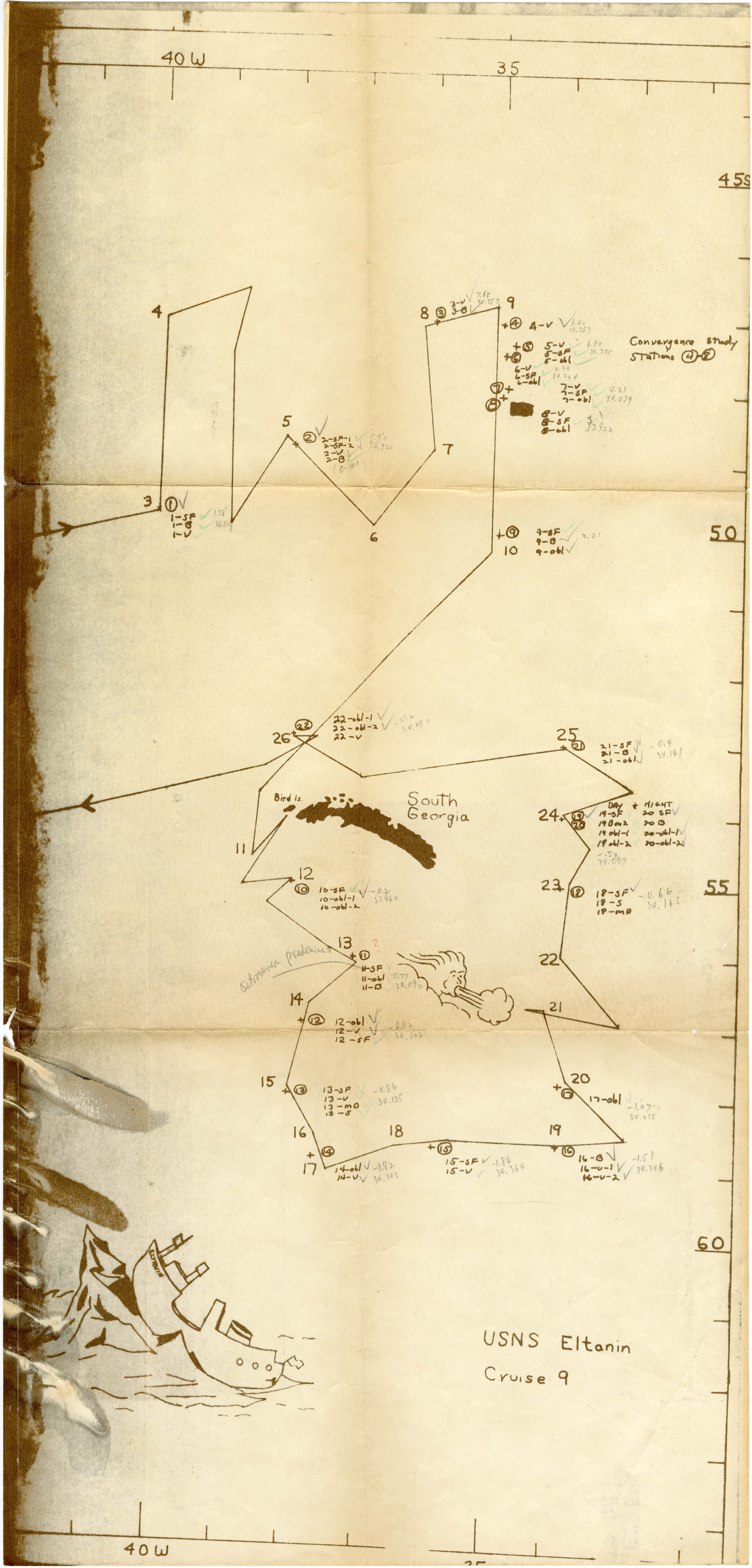
A plotting chart created by Bé

Allan Wie Hwa Bé (1931 – October 13, 1983) was a micropaleontologist. He was considered a pioneer in research about planktonic foraminiferal ecology. He also served as president of the Cushman Foundation for Foraminiferal Research.

== Personal life ==
Bé enjoyed cross-country skiing and swimming. He died suddenly October 13, 1983.

== Career ==
Bé worked primarily out of the Lamont–Doherty Earth Observatory of Columbia University, where he was also a graduate student. In the mid-20th century he researched the distribution of planktonic foraminifera species in the environment based on the seasons, and developed taxonomy work about the species. In the 1970s and 1980s, he worked with O. Roger Anderson, exploring how environmental changes affect individual planktonic foraminifera. He published an average of five papers per year, to a total of approximately 100. He served as president of the Cushman Foundation for Foraminiferal Research.

== Bibliography ==
- Bé, Allan W. H. Biology of planktonic foraminifera. Berkeley: University of California (1982).
- Bé, Allan W. H. and Andrew McIntyre. Paleoecology of Coccolithophorids and Planktonic Foraminifera in Deep-sea Sediments: An Electron-microscopic Study. New York: Columbia University in the City of New York, Lamont Geological Observatory (1965).
