= Gustaf Troedsson =

Swedish geologist and paleontologist

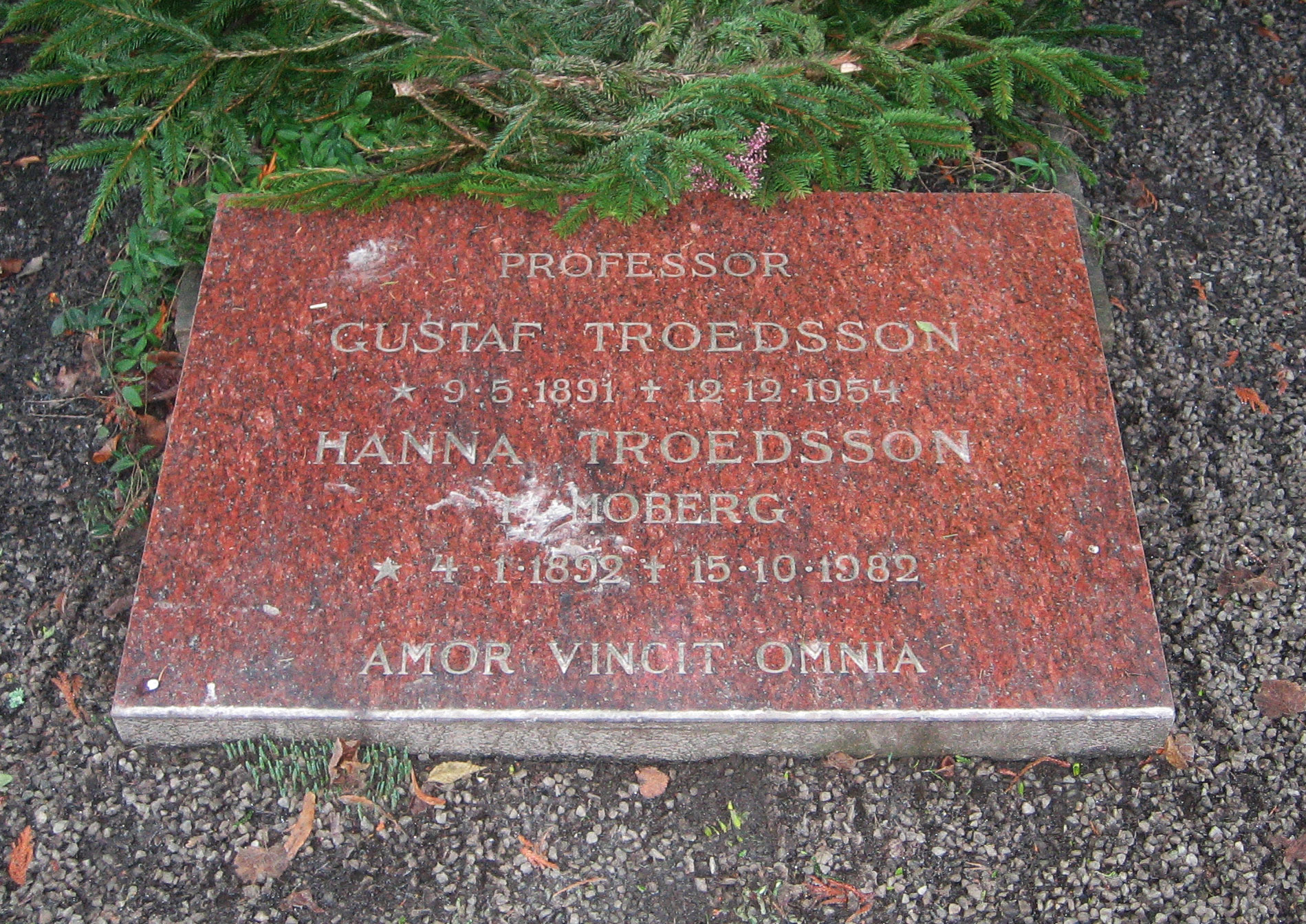
Gustaf Troedsson's grave in Lund

Gustaf Timothy Troedsson (9 May 1891, in Kulleröd, Northern Åkarps parish, Kristianstad County – 12 December 1954, in Lund), was a Swedish geologist and paleontologist. He was the son of Troed Troedsson, and the father of Trygve Troedsson.

Troedsson defended his Ph.D. in geology in 1918 on the thesis Om Skånes brachiopodskiffer (On brachiopod shale of Skane) at Lund University, where he became associate professor in 1919. He was Professor of Geology at Stockholm University from 1924 till 1929 and became a lecturer in biology and geography at Higher general secondary school in Helsingborg in 1929. He became lecturer in geography and biology at the Higher general secondary school on Kungsholmen in Stockholm and associate professor of geology at the University of Stockholm in 1933. He was awarded the title of professor in 1943 and became professor of geology, particularly historical geology at Lund University in 1950.

Troedsson research focussed on early paleozoic fossils, stratigraphy and geography, as well as on mesozoic formations in southern Sweden. He also studied Ordovician faunas from Greenland (1926–28) and fossils from Central Asia from the Cambrian and Ordovician (1937). He showed particular interest in cephalopods.

Among his works on the Mesozoic is a survey of crocodile finds in Skåne youngest Cretaceous (1923–24). He took part in the third edition of William Ramsay's "Geology grounds" (1931).

He became a member of Physiographic Society in Lund in 1950 and of the Academy of Sciences in 1951. He was married to Hanna Troedsson (1892–1982), daughter of Johan Christian Moberg. Troedsson is buried in the North Cemetery in Lund.
