= Rafael Royo-Torres =

Spanish paleontologist

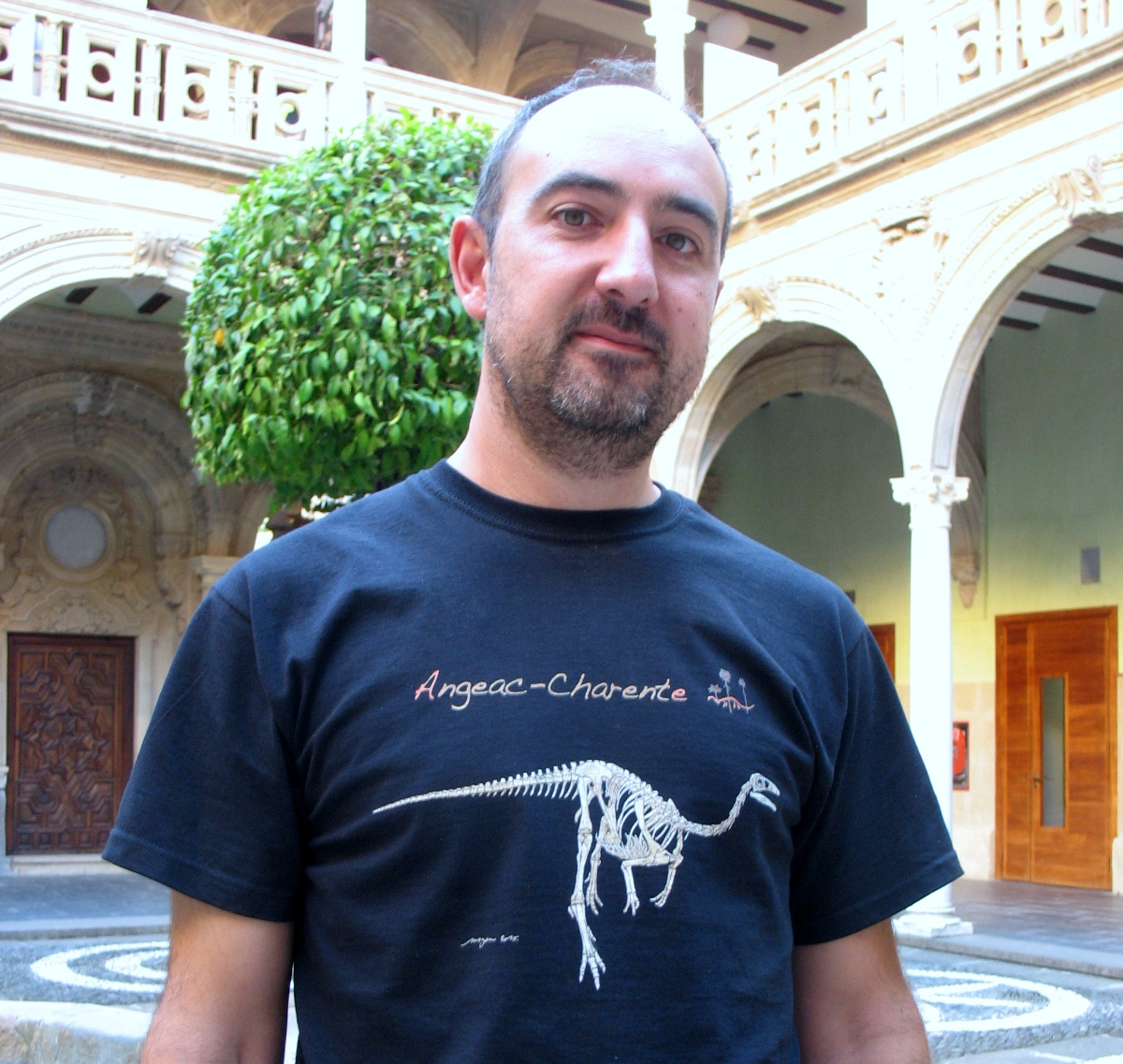
- Scientific career
- Fields: Paleontologist
- Workplaces: Fundación Conjunto Paleontológico de Teruel-Dinópolis

Dr. Rafael Royo-Torres is a Spanish Paleontologist. He works in Fundación Conjunto Paleontológico de Teruel-Dinópolis, in Teruel, Spain. He is one of the discoverers of Turiasaurus riodevensis, together with Luis Alcalá and Alberto Cobos.
