= Serge Legendre =

Serge Legendre is a research scientist in the field of paleobiology with the Institute of Paleoenvironment & PaleoBiosphere, University of Lyon and editor-in-chief of Geobios, a scientific journal published bi-monthly.

== Publications ==
- Correlation of carnassial tooth size and body weight in recent carnivores (mammalia), in association with Claudia Roth.
- Using cenograms to investigate gaps in mammalian body mass distributions in Australian mammals (2009). Library Network of Western Switzerland.
- Spatial and temporal variation in European Neogene large mammals diversity (2009).
- Mammalian Communities Document a Latitudinal Environmental Gradient during the Miocene Climatic Optimum in Western Europe (2008) LNWS.
