= Manfred Reichel =

Manfred Reichel (1896–1984) was a Swiss micropaleontologist best known for his work on the morphology of foraminiferans, especially alveolinids. He taught as a professor at the University of Basel for almost forty years, where he became the school's first professor of paleontology in 1940. Lukas Hottinger studied under him during this time. Trained in zoology, Reichel also had a keen interest in the flight mechanics of birds, pterosaurs and bats, about which he published several papers.

Reichel was also an accomplished artist, and his heavily detailed style lent itself well to illustrating complex foraminiferal structures. His pen and ink drawings of pterosaurs and the early bird Archaeopteryx, rendered in lifelike poses, remain some of his most well-known work today. His Archaeopteryx illustrations in particular are well-regarded even by today's standards and are still considered to be highly accurate. He also translated Alfred Wegener's book on the origin of continents into French.
