= Richard S. Boardman =

American paleontologist

Richard Stanton Boardman
- Born: July 16, 1923
- Died: 2011
- Education: University of Illinois
- Known for: bryozoans, morphology
- Scientific career
- Fields: Paleontology

Richard S. Boardman (1923–2011) was an American paleontologist and curator of the Department of Paleobiology at the United States National Museum (now the National Museum of Natural History). Boardman worked for the museum from 1957 to 1985 and subsequently became a founding member of the International Bryozoology Association (IBA). Boardman is best known for the hard/soft thin-sectioning technique that he developed in order to compare the internal morphology of living and fossilized bryozoans which have revealed new information about bryozoan life history.
