= George Herbert Girty =

American paleontologist

- Born: 1869
- Died: 1939 (aged 69–70)
- Education: Stanford University; Yale University
- Scientific career
- Fields: Paleontology
- Workplaces: United States Geological Survey

George Herbert Girty (1869–1939) was an American paleontologist.

== Biography ==
Girty was educated at Yale University, where he obtained his PhD in 1894. During his postgraduate year at Stanford University in 1895, he was appointed as a paleontologist, and worked for the United States Geological Survey. He kept that position till he retired 44 years later. He is best known for his research on Permian faunas and for researches of Mississippian and Pennsylvanian invertebrates, in the Western United States.

== Works ==
During his lifetime he wrote only one book:

- 1911 — The Fauna of the Moorefield Shale of Arkansas

He also co-authored in writing a book called:

- 1907 — The Arkansas coal field

== See also ==
- James Steele Williams
