= Nadezhda Voronets =

Russian geologist, paleontologist (1881–1979)

Nadezhda Voronets (1881–1979) (Russian: Надежда Степановна Воронец) was a Russian and Soviet geologist and paleontologist. One of the first female paleontologists in Russia, she was an honorary member of the All-Union Paleontological Society (1971) and a specialist in Mesozoic mollusks of the North and Far East of the USSR. She was also known as N.S. Kulzhinskaya-Voronets (Кулжинская-Воронец).

== Biography ==
She was born in 1881 (née Kulzhinskaya) in the city of Nizhyn, Chernigov province. After graduating from high school in St. Petersburg in 1902, Voronets remained there to study at the Higher Bestuzhev Courses for Women in Franz Loewinson-Lessing's geology group at the Faculty of Physics and Mathematics, graduating in 1914. She spoke German, French, English and Italian. With Loewinson-Lessing, she traveled to the Caucasus Mountains for a geological internship. She worked under the direction of Konstantin Focht during the 1910 summer expedition of the Geological Committee to the Crimea. With her husband, she traveled to Italy in 1910–1911 and explored Mount Vesuvius. During the First World War, she gave private lessons in Petrograd (formerly known as St. Petersburg) from 1914 to 1916. As a soil scientist, she worked on the soils of Western Siberia for the Department for Soil Improvement of the Ministry of Agriculture.

After the Russian October Revolution, Voronets headed the scientific library of the Supreme Council of National Economy in Moscow from 1918 to 1919. From 1919 to 1926, she lived with her husband and paused her professional work "for family reasons."

From 1926, Voronets worked in Leningrad (formerly known as St. Petersburg) as a geologist-paleontologist for the Geological Committee, which became the Central Research Institute of Geological Prospecting (CNIGR) in 1931. In 1934, she moved to the Moscow Institute of Mineral Resources (since 1935 the All-Union Institute of Mineral Resources (VIMS)) as a senior paleontologist. After completing her work at VIMS, she worked on a contract basis in Leningrad from 1937.

After the outbreak of the German war of aggression against the Soviet Union, Voronets worked in the trenches, clearing streets, and providing aid to the air defense effort for the city of Leningrad, which was besieged by German troops. She was awarded a medal of honor for her work. From 1943 onward, she received a personal pension from the government.

From 1949, Voronets worked as a research associate and head of a working group at the Research Institute of Arctic Geology (NIIGA) in Leningrad. She described the new inoceramic genus Eoinoceramus Voronets, which was named after her. The fossil cephalopod Cadoceras voronetsae was named after her in 1964. Her paleontological collection is kept in the Central Scientific Research Geological Museum in St. Petersburg.

She was made an honorary member of the Soviet Paleontological Society in 1971. On the anniversary of her 130th birthday in 2011, the 47th meeting of the Russian Paleontological Society was dedicated to her work.

She died in 1979.

== Honors ==
- Medal “For the Defense of Leningrad” (1944)
- Best in the Socialist Competition
- Certificate of Recognition of the Head Office of the Northern Sea Route (1951)
