= Richard Bateman =

Richard Bateman may refer to:

- Richard Bateman (botanist) (born 1958), British botanist
- Richard Bateman (cricketer) (1849–1913), English cricketer
- Richard Bateman (bassist), bassist with Nasty Savage

== See also ==
- Richard Bateman-Robson (1753–1827), MP
