= Martin I. Simpson =

British palaeontologist, a geologist

Martin I. Simpson is a British amateur palaeontologist and geologist. He lives on the Isle of Wight and runs Island Gems. Though perhaps best known for his work on Cretaceous fossil crustaceans and on the Cretaceous Lower Greensand Group stratigraphy. He produced a pamphlet on fossil hunting in 1998, titled Fossil Hunting on Dinosaur Island, and was heavily involved in the excavation of the ankylosaur Vectipelta.

He has also written about the trade in fossils and on the relationship between academic palaeontologists, dealers, and fossil collectors. In the BBC TV series Live from Dinosaur Island (2001), Simpson was associated with the discovery of Isle of Wight amber.

== Bibliography ==
- Simpson, Michael (1993). Fossil Hunting on Dinosaur Island. Martin Simpson (Whitwell). ISBN 978-0-9522118-0-8. pp. 48.
