= Vishnu-Mittre =

Vishnu Mittre

Vishnu-Mittre or Vishnu Mittre (17 July 1924 – 6 November 1991) was an Indian paleobotanist who worked at the Birbal Sahni Institute and wrote numerous influential papers and popular books on earth history, particularly with reference to the Indian region. He worked along with archaeologists in pioneering studies of agricultural crops in early human settlements on the Indian Subcontinent.

== Biography ==
Vishnu-Mittre was born in Shorkot, Jhang District of Pakistan. After studying at Rawalpindi, he obtained a BSc from Gordon College in 1944 and became a school teacher in biology at D.A.V. College and later at D.C.Jain College. He then joined the Benaras Hindu University and received an MSc in botany in 1951. He then joined the Birbal Sahni Institute of Paleobotany in Lucknow and studied Mesozoic plants. He was deputed to Emmanuel College, Cambridge University from where he received a Ph.D. in 1960 after working under Sir Harry Godwin on Quaternary palynology. He returned to the Birbal Sahni Institute and started a palynology department and served as the deputy director of the institute from 1983 to 1984.

== Publications ==
Vishnu-Mittre wrote numerous papers and also wrote two popular work on earth history and evolution, Evolution of Life (1969, coauthored with M.S.Randhawa and others) and Rocks unfold the Past (1973). Among his researches were studies of pollen at archaeological sites to gain an understanding on agriculture and the usage of plant materials in the past. Some of his publications include:

- Vishnu-Mittre (1954). "Petrified spores and pollen grains from the Jurassic rocks of Rajmahal Hills, Bihar" (PDF). The Palaeobotanist. 3: 117–127.
- Erdtman, G.; Vishnu-Mittre (1956). "On terminology in pollen and spore morphology" (PDF). Palaeobotanist. 5 (2): 109–111.
- Vishnu-Mittre (1968). "Protohistoric records of agriculture in India". Trans. Bose Res. Inst. Calcutta. 31: 87–106.
- Vishnu-Mittre (1972). "Neolithic plants economy at Chirand, Bihar" (PDF). Palaeobotanist. 21 (1): 18–22.
- Vishnu-Mittre (1976). "Palaeoecology of the Rajasthan desert during the last 10,000" (PDF). Palaeobotanist. 25: 549–558.
- Vishnu-Mittre; Gupta, H.P. (1970). "The origin of Shola Forest in the Nilgiris, South India" (PDF). Palaeobotanist. 19 (1): 110–114.
- Vishnu-Mittre (1979). "Palaeobotanical evidences of the environment of early man in northwestern and western India". Grana. 18 (3): 167–181. doi:10.1080/00173137909424976.
- Vishnu-Mittre; Guzder, Statira (1973). "The early domestication of plants in south and southeast Asia - a critical review" (PDF). Palaeobotanist. 22 (2): 83–88. [The URL given is in fact that of the subsequent "Quaternary Palaeobotany/Palynology" article, and not that of the article cited. Will someone please correct?]
- Vishnu-Mittre (1983). "Quaternary Palaeobotany/Palynology in the Himalaya an overview" (PDF). Palaeobotanist. 32 (2): 158–187.
- Vishnu-Mittre; Savithri, R. (1976). "Setaria in Ancient plant economy of India" (PDF). Palaeobotanist. 25: 559–564.

In 1968 Vishnu-Mittre suggested that a sample of carbonised grain dating to 1800 BC from Hallur contained Eleusine suggesting Indian origins to the cultivation of ragi. The samples were re-examined by others in 1979 and the identification was found to be incorrect, in fact the suggestion was that the grain did not even match that of a monocot.
