= Claudia Roth (paleobiologist) =

German paleobiologist (born 1958)

Claudia Roth is a research scientist in the field of paleobiology. She is associated with Institute of Sciences of Evolution, Lille University of Science and Technology, Villeneuve-d'Ascq, France and the Institute of Geosciences-Palaeontology, University of Mainz, Germany. Roth and Legendre have both contributed as a team to the Paleobiology Database, an online closed scientific database.

== Publications ==
- Correlation of carnassial tooth size and body weight in recent carnivores (mammalia) in association with Serge Legendre. Subjects: Animal Taxonomy; Palaeontology; Paleobiology. Taylor & Francis, Volume 1, Issue 1, p. 85-98.
