= Robert Masterman Stainforth =

English micropaleontologist and stratigrapher (1915–2002)

R. M. Stainforth (known usually as Charles) (October 5 1915 – September 30 2002) was a micropaleontologist and stratigrapher best known for his innovative work on the application of planktonic foraminifera to worldwide stratigraphic correlation. His work was based on the microfauna and stratigraphy of South America, especially as related to petroleum geology.

Born in Kingston-upon-Hull in the East Riding of Yorkshire, Stainforth studied at the Royal School of Mines in London, where he earned a ‘Bachelor of Science in the Technology of Oil’ in 1938. Upon graduation he was offered a position as a paleontologist at Pointe-à-Pierre in Trinidad working for Trinidad Leaseholds Ltd. Those working at the laboratory, including Stainforth, had a great influence on the study of stratigraphy in the years that followed. The management of the company, encouraged by Dr. Hans Kugler and a succession of Chief Geologists, allowed a generous publication policy, not always the case in industry but undoubtedly good for the advancement of science.

In the years after 1945 Stainforth worked in Ecuador, Colombia, Egypt, Peru, Venezuela, France and the United States in the employ of different oil companies, all affiliates of Esso. In 1952 he earned a Ph.D. in Geology from the University of London. He spent several years, 1948 to 1954, in Peru and from 1958 to 1969 he worked in Venezuela. He was in other places for periods as brief as a few months, but the effect of the rapid succession was to enable him to publish on faunal sequences encountered around the world.

His major accomplishment was his pioneering work on the potential of planktonic foraminifera as ideal tools for worldwide correlation of Mesozoic and Tertiary strata. His many important papers and talks related to this subject and his anticipation of future developments had a lasting impact on much of the Tertiary stratigraphical work carried out for decades after.

Upon his retirement in 1969 he moved to Victoria, British Columbia, Canada. He was married in 1941 and had two children. In his spare time he enjoyed a game of bridge or dice, and was a keen stamp collector. He incidentally co-authored a pamphlet on the rules of dice, and wrote a brief paper for his grandchildren on the derivation of pi.
