= Hisakatsu Yabe =

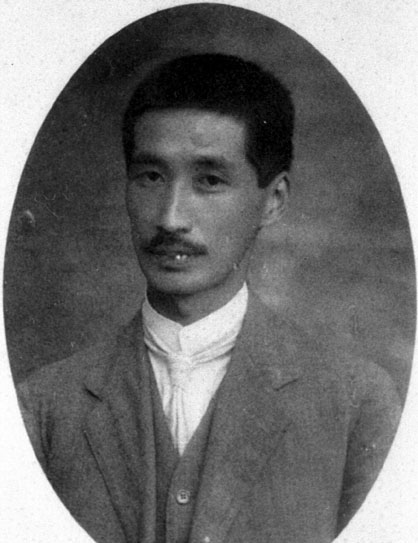
Hisakatsu Yabe

Hisakatsu Yabe (Japanese: 矢部 長克, December 3, 1878 – June 23, 1969) was a Japanese paleontologist and geologist. He is from Tokyo and is a graduate of the University of Tokyo. He was an emeritus professor at Tohoku University. Yabe contributed to the development of geology in Japan. In 1918, He advocated Itoigawa-Shizuoka Tectonic Line.
