= James Steele Williams =

American paleontologist

James Steele Williams (1896–1957) was an American paleontologist and stratigraphist.

In 1921, he began working as an Instructor of Geology at the University of Missouri, where he remained till 1930, when he got Associate Professor position. The same year, he joined USGS as assistant, and later even succeeded George Herbert Girty, who was the specialist on late Paleozoic marine fauna. He also worked as a staff for Missouri Bureau of Mines and Geology. He died with a position of Principal Geologist.
