= Alberto Cobos =

Spanish paleontologist

- Scientific career
- Fields: Paleontologist
- Workplaces: Fundación Conjunto Paleontológico de Teruel-Dinópolis

Alberto Cobos Periañez is a Spanish paleontologist. He is the director of the Fundación Conjunto Paleontológico de Teruel-Dinópolis, in Teruel, Spain. He is one of the discoverers of Turiasaurus riodevensis, together with Rafael Royo-Torres and Luis Alcalá.
