= Susan Cachel =

American anthropologist

Susan Marie Cachel
- Education: University of Chicago
- Scientific career
- Fields: paleontology
- Workplaces: Rutgers University
- Thesis: The origins of the anthropoid grade (1976)

Susan Cachel (born 1949) is an American anthropologist, paleontologist, and researcher who specializes in primate evolution. In 2009, she was named a Fellow of the American Association for the Advancement of Science for her work in the field of primate evolution.

== Education ==
Cachel has a B.A. (1970), M.A. (1971), and a Ph.D. (1976) from the University of Chicago. Her Ph.D. thesis advisor was R.H. Tuttle. She has been at Rutgers University since 1977.

== Selected publications ==
- Cachel, Susan (2006). Primate and human evolution. Cambridge, UK: Cambridge University Press. ISBN 0-521-82942-9. OCLC 64312971.
- Cachel, Susan (2015). Fossil primates. Cambridge. ISBN 978-1-107-00530-3. OCLC 890377461.
