= Luis Alcalá =

Spanish paleontologist

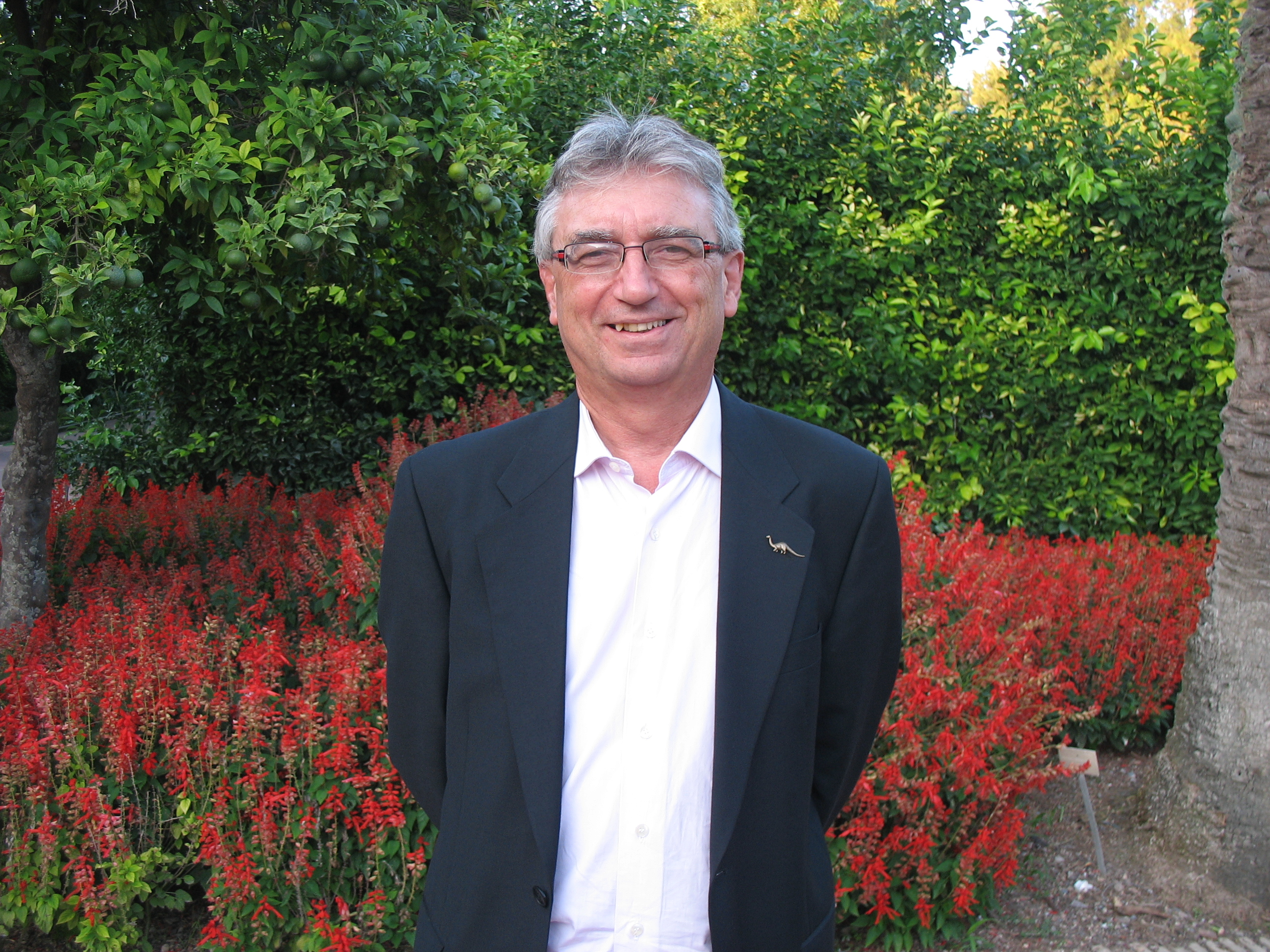
- Scientific career
- Fields: Paleontologist
- Workplaces: Fundación Conjunto Paleontológico de Teruel-Dinópolis

Luis Alcalá Martínez is a Spanish paleontologist.

== Biography ==
Dr. Luis Alcalá is a Spanish Paleontologist. He is the director of Fundación Conjunto Paleontológico de Teruel-Dinópolis, in Teruel, Spain. He is one of the discoverers of Turiasaurus riodevensis, together with Rafael Royo-Torres and Alberto Cobos.
