= Gustave Campiche =

Swiss physician

Gustave Campiche (August 1809 in La Sagne – 1871 in Sainte-Croix in the canton of Vaud) was a Swiss medical doctor best known for his work in the fields of geology and paleontology.

Initially trained as a veterinarian, his interests later switched to medicine, of which, he received a doctorate at Lyon. After practicing medicine in the town of Rolle, he relocated as a doctor to Sainte-Croix in 1847, where he remained up until his death in 1871. In 1861 he became a member of the Grand Conseil in the canton of Vaud, and in 1870 received the title of préfet.

In his spare time, he conducted geological and paleontological investigations in the vicinity of Sainte-Croix, and in the process collected many fossil brachiopods, bryozoans, echinoids and sponges. With François-Jules Pictet de la Rive, he described the extinct gastropod genera Pseudomelania (1862), Cryptoplocus (1862) and Pseudocassis (1863), as well as numerous fossil species. Some of his collected material was sent to the Musee Geologique in Lausanne.

He made contributions to Pictet's Description des fossiles du terrain crétacé des environs de Sainte-Croix (1858–72. five parts), and to Georges de Tribolet's Description géologique des environs de Sainte-Croix (1858).
