= Ernesto Pérez d'Angelo =

Chilean geologist and paleontologist

- Born: 1932; Punta Arenas, Chile
- Died: 2013 (aged 80–81)
- Education: University of Chile
- Known for: Development of paleontology in Chile
- Awards: Medalla “Juan Brüggen” (2012)
- Scientific career
- Fields: Geology, paleontology
- Workplaces: University of Chile; National Geology and Mining Service

Ernesto Pérez d'Angelo (1932 – 2013) was a Chilean geologist and paleontologist. He is known for his contributions to the development of paleontology in Chile. His contributions include the organizing of paleontology libraries and fossil collections and the description of numerous new taxa of the Mesozoic. From 1986 to 1997 he was editor of Revista Geológica de Chile.
