= Wataru Ishijima =

Wataru Ishijima (石島 渉, Ishijima Wataru; 1906–1980) was a paleontologist and geologist. Ishijima was one of the most prolific researchers of fossil calcareous algae. After graduating from the Imperial Fisheries Institute (Tokyo; current Tokyo University of Marine Science and Technology) in 1927, Ishijima joined the Institute of Geology and Paleontology, Faculty of Science, Tohoku Imperial University (Sendai) from 1927 to 1931. He then worked at the Institute of Geology, Taihoku Imperial University (Taipei) during 1942–1945 and then at the Rikkyo University (Tokyo) from 1945 to 1980. His doctoral dissertation was submitted to Tohoku University and was privately published by Yūhodō (Ishijima, 1954). He described a total of 139 taxa of fossil calcareous algae (Iryu, 2004) including at least 114 species of Corallinales, and he produced more than 45 publications on coralline algal taxonomy.

== Some references ==
- Ishijima, W. 1943. On some fossil coralline algae from the ryukyu limestone of the Ryukyu Islands and Formosa (Taiwan). Memoirs of the Faculty of Science Taihoku Imperial University, Series III, Vol 1 (3): 49–76.
- Ishijima W. 1954. Cenozoic coralline algae from the western Pacific. Privately Published, Yūhodō, Tokyo, 87 pp.
- Iryu I. 2004. Calcareous algae. pp. 3–30. In IKEYA, N., HIRANO, H. and OGASAWARA, K. (eds.). The database of Japanese fossil type specimens described during the 20th Century (Part 4). Palaeontological Society of Japan, special papers 42, 1–72.
- Iryu, Y., Bassi, D., Woelkerling, W., 2009. Re-assessment of the type collections of fourteen corallinalean species (Corallinales, Rhodophyta) described by W. Ishijima (1942–1960). Palaeontology, v. 52, p. 401–427. doi:10.1111/j.1475-4983.2009.00850.x
- Iryu Y., Bassi D., Woelkerling, W., 2012. Typification and reassessment of seventeen species of coralline red algae (Corallinales and Sporolithales, Rhodophyta) described by W. Ishijima during 1954–1978. Journal of Systematic Palaeontology, v. 10/1, p. 171–209. doi:10.1080/14772019.2010.550325
