= Michael Frogley =

Michael Frogley is a Quaternary palaeoecologist whose research interests currently include:

1. the use of stable isotope geochemistry to help determine the climatic histories of lake basins;
2. the analysis of changes in Quaternary palaeobiogeographical patterns of selected invertebrate faunal groups, particularly around the Mediterranean; and
3. the relationship between rapid-scale climatic change and societal collapse in the Andean highlands of Peru.

He is a member of the ISOMED working group, involved in the analysis and synthesis of Mediterranean isotopic climatic records; he is also a founding member of the ECCUZ working group, concerned with examining the links between Late Holocene environmental and cultural change in the Cuzco region of Peru. In conjunction with Alex Chepstow-Lusy and Brian Bauer, Michael Frogley unveiled "a new approach" to the problem of detailing Incan history by using the evidence deposited by Oribatid mites.

== Background ==
Frogley graduated from Kingston University in 1993 with a BSc (Hons) in Geology. His doctoral research at the University of Cambridge (1993–97), was primarily concerned with the multi-proxy analysis of a sedimentary sequence from the Ioannina Lake basin in NW Greece.

On gaining a Research Fellowship in Earth Sciences at St John's College, Cambridge (1996-2000), his post-doctoral work continued these investigations, focusing on the character of climatic variability in the Eastern Mediterranean during the last interglacial period.

He joined the University of Sussex in October 2000 as a Lecturer in Physical Geography and became Senior Lecturer in October 2005.
