= Georges de Tribolet =

Swiss geologist

Georges de Tribolet (20 December 1830 in Neuchâtel – 18 May 1873) was a Swiss geologist. He was the older brother of geologist and paleontologist, Maurice de Tribolet (1852–1929).

He studied chemistry at the University of Giessen as a pupil of Justus von Liebig, then continued his education at Zurich, where he studied chemistry, botany and geology, with geologist Arnold Escher von der Linth being an important influence to his career. In 1853 he received his PhD from the University of Heidelberg with a dissertation on porphyritic rocks. Following graduation, he furthered his education in Paris and Berlin, returning in 1855 to Neuchâtel, where he worked as a geologist and museum curator.

While a student, he travelled extensively, conducting geological excursions in the Harz and Jura Mountains, the Alps and throughout the Black Forest. He is best remembered for his investigations of the Cretaceous terrain of the Jura, with the Neocomian strata being a specific subject of research.

== Published works ==
- 1853. Ueber die Zusammensetzung der Quareporphyre, in Annalen der Chemie und Pharmacie, vol. 87, p. 331. – On the composition of porphyry.
- 1854. Analyses de roches et lois de Bunsen et de Sainte-Claire Deville, in Bull. III, 3, p. 190.– Analyses of rocks associated with the laws of Bunsen and Sainte-Claire Deville.
- 1856. Sur la carte géologique des environs de Sainte-Croix, in Bull. IV, 1, p. 14. — A geological chart on the environs of Sainte-Croix.
- 1856. Catalogue des fossiles du Néocomien moyen de Neuchâtel, in Bull. IV, 1, p. 69. — Catalog of fossils from the Middle Neocomian stage of Neuchâtel
- 1856. Notice sur la présence des terrains crétacés dans les gorges de la Reuse, in Bull. IV, 1, p. 102.– On the presence of Cretaceous terrain in the Gorges de l'Areuse.
- 1857. Des fossiles néocomiens dans les environs de Morteau, in Bull. IV, 2, p. 168. — Neocomian fossils from the vicinity of Morteau.
- 1857. Sur le terrain valangien, in Bull. IV, 2, p. 203. – On the Valanginian stage.
- 1859. Sur F Ammonites Astieri, in Bull. V, 1, p. 21. — On Ammonites astieri.
- 1859. Anciens travaux de défense et changements dans le niveau du lac, in Bull. V, 1, p. 15.
- 1859. Analyse de l'ouvrage de M. Marcou sur le Néocomien, in Bull. V, 1, p. 32. – Analysis on the work by Jules Marcou about the Neocomian stage.
- 1860. Description géologique des environs de Sainte-Croix, in Mat. Paléont. Suisse, 2°, e série – Geological description of the environs of Sainte-Croix.
- 1869. Sur le terrain tithonique de M. Oppel, in Bull. VIII, 3, p. 371 – On the Tithonian stage of Albert Oppel.
