= Heinrich Quiring =

German paleontologist and geologist

Heinrich Quiring (31 January 1883, Hüllen near Gelsenkirchen – 19 June 1964, Berlin) was a German paleontologist and geologist.

He studied at the Ludwig-Maximilians-Universität München as a student of Paul Groth, and afterward continued his education at the Bergakademie (Mining Academy) in Berlin. In 1912, he received his doctorate in geology from the University of Bonn with the thesis Zur Stratigraphie der Nordosthälfte der Sötenicher Mulde. Beginning in 1914 he worked for the Prussian Geological Survey, and in 1929 attained the title of professor. From 1946, he was a professor of geology and paleontology at Technische Universität Berlin.

== Selected works ==
- Geschichte des Goldes; die Goldenen Zeitalter in ihrer kulturellen und wirtschaftlichen Bedeutung, 1948 – History of gold. The golden age in its cultural and economic importance.
- Weltkörperentstehung : eine Kosmogonie auf geologischer Grundlage, 1953 – "Weltkörperentstehung": A cosmogony based on geology.
- Heraklit : worte tönen durch Jahrtausende; Griechisch und deutsch, 1959 – Heraclitus: words resound through the millennia; Greek and German.
- Platinmetalle: Platin, Palladium, Iridium, Osmium, Rhodium, Ruthenium, 1962 – Platinum metals: Platinum, palladium, iridium, osmium, rhodium and ruthenium.
