= Leslie Moore =

Leslie Moore may refer to:

- Leslie King (footballer) (born 1963), New Zealand football player, also known as Leslie Moore
- Leslie M. Moore, statistician at Los Alamos National Laboratory
- Leslie Rowsell Moore (1912–2003), professor of geology at Sheffield University
- Les Moore (1933–1992), English footballer
