= Richard Aldridge =

British palaeontologist and academic

Richard John Aldridge
- Born: 16 December 1945
- Died: 4 February 2014 (aged 68)
- Education: University of Southampton
- Awards: Pander Medal of the Pander Society; 2011 Lapworth Medal of the Palaeontological Association; 2012 Coke Medal of the Geological Society of London; 2012 Brady Medal of The Micropalaeontological Society; President of the Palaeontological Association; President of the International Palaeontological Association
- Scientific career
- Fields: Palaeontology
- Workplaces: University College London; University of Nottingham; University of Leicester
- Doctoral advisor: Ronald Leyshon Austin
- Doctoral students: Philip Donoghue; M. Paul Smith

Richard John Aldridge (16 December 1945 – 4 February 2014) was a British palaeontologist and academic, who was Bennett Professor of Geology at the University of Leicester.

== Academic career ==
Aldridge's career began at Southampton University before moving to a temporary lectureship at University College London. He then joined the University of Nottingham where he remained until 1989, having reached the rank of Reader in Palaeontology. Following the Oxburgh Review of Earth Sciences, he moved to the University of Leicester. He served two terms as Head of Department, and was F.W. Bennett Professor of Geology from 2002 until he retired in 2011.

Aldridge's research has been focused primarily on the conodont biostratigraphy and palaeobiology and one of his seminal contributions has been to uncover the vertebrate nature of the long-enigmatic conodont animal, principally in collaboration with Derek Briggs and Euan Clarkson. This was achieved through careful analysis of skeletal remains, but also through analysis of rare soft tissue remains of conodonts. This led naturally to Aldridge's later research focus which was fossil Lagerstätten.

Aldridge was awarded the Pander Medal of the Pander society in 2006. He was President of the Palaeontological Association and of the British Micropalaeontological Society (1995-1998).
