= Philip Donoghue =

British paleontologist (born 1971)

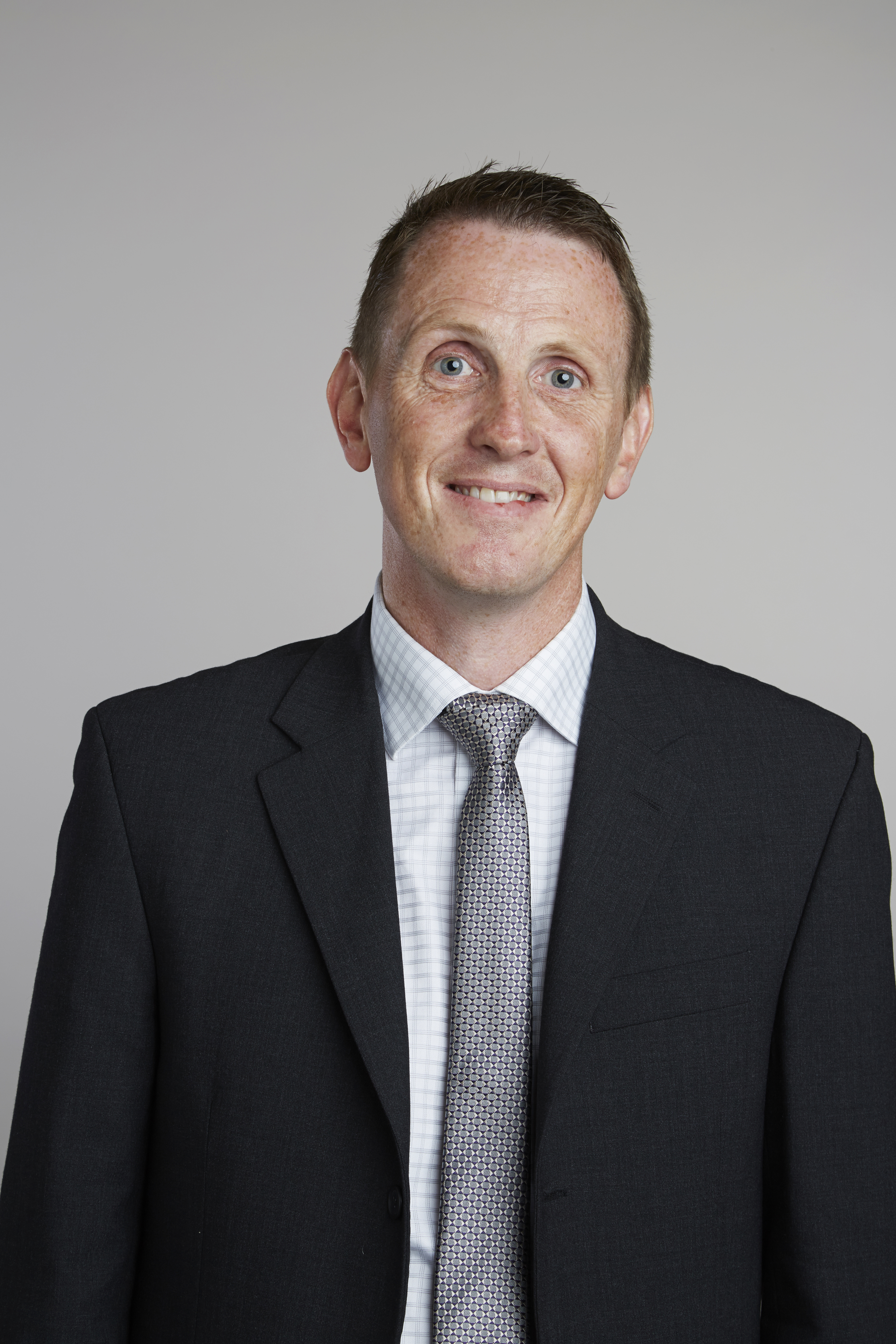
- Donoghue in 2015
- Born: Philip Conrad James Donoghue; 5 April 1971 (age 55); Morriston, Wales
- Education: University of Leicester (BSc, PhD); University of Sheffield (MSc)
- Awards: FRS (2015); President's Medal (2014); Royal Society Wolfson Research Merit Award (2013); Charles Schuchert Award (2010); Bigsby Medal (2007); Hodson Fund (2005); Philip Leverhulme Prize (2004); Murchison Fund (2002); President's Award from the Palaeontological Association (1996)
- Scientific career
- Fields: Palaeobiology; Developmental biology; Bodyplan evolution; Metazoa; Vertebrates
- Workplaces: University of Bristol
- Thesis: Architecture, growth, and function of ozarkodinid conodonts (1996)
- Doctoral advisor: Richard Aldridge; Mark Purnell
- Website: donoghue.blogs.bristol.ac.uk

Philip Conrad James Donoghue FRS is a British palaeontologist and Professor of Palaeobiology at the University of Bristol.

== Education ==
Donoghue was educated at the University of Leicester where he was awarded a Bachelor of Science degree in geology in 1992 and PhD in Paleontology in 1997 for research supervised by Richard Aldridge and Mark Purnell. He also holds a Master of Science degree in palynology from the University of Sheffield.

== Research and career ==
Donoghue held an 1851 Research Fellowship at the School of Earth Sciences of the University of Birmingham in 1997–1998, and a NERC Independent Research Fellow at the Department of Geology of the University of Leicester in 1999 before returning to the University of Birmingham where he held a proleptic appointment and then lecturer in palaeobiology from 1999 to 2003. Donoghue moved to the School of Earth Sciences of the University of Bristol as lecturer in geology from 2003 to 2007, senior lecturer in geology in 2007–2008, reader in geology from 2008 to 2010 and professor of palaeobiology in 2010. Donoghue was a NESTA Research Fellow from 2005 to 2007.

Donoghue's research focuses on major transitions in evolutionary history, including the origin and early evolution of vertebrates, animals, and plants. He has been influential in developing a 'molecular palaeobiology' in which evidence from living and fossil species, anatomy and molecular biology, phylogenetics and developmental biology, can be integrated to achieve a more holistic understanding of evolutionary history. He introduced synchrotron tomography to palaeontology, and has played a leading role in establishing the role of palaeontology in establishing evolutionary timescales.

== Awards and honours ==
Donoghue was elected a Fellow of the Royal Society (FRS) in 2015. His certificate of election reads:

Philip Donoghue is a major force in the emerging field of molecular palaeontology. His work bridges the gap between palaeobiology, developmental biology and molecular evolution in highly innovative ways. He was pioneering in first demonstrating the utility of synchrotron imaging in palaeontology and has been a world leader in driving forward our understanding of the remarkable fossil embryos from the late pre-Cambrian and Cambrian and their biological significance. His work takes developmental and genomic data constrained by the fossil record to bring new insights into large-scale evolutionary patterns and the relationship between phenotypic and gene regulatory evolution.

Donoghue has been on the Councils of the Palaeontological Association, Systematics Association, the Micropalaeontological Society and the European Society for Evolutionary Developmental Biology. His research has been recognised by the award of the Philip Leverhulme Prize of the Leverhulme Trust in 2004, the Bigsby Medal of the Geological Society in 2007, and the President's Medal of the Palaeontological Association in 2014.
