= Peter von Bitter =

Canadian academic

Peter von Bitter is an Emeritus Professor in the Department of Geology at the University of Toronto and he holds a post at the Royal Ontario Museum. His research has been wide-ranging but focused on conodonts. His most noted work was his examination of the well preserved fossil vent communities in Lower Carboniferous strata of western Newfoundland.

== Professional affiliations ==
- Fellow of the Geological Association of Canada,
- Pander society, Chief Panderer
