= Hadrosaur diet =

Diet of extinct family of dinosaurs

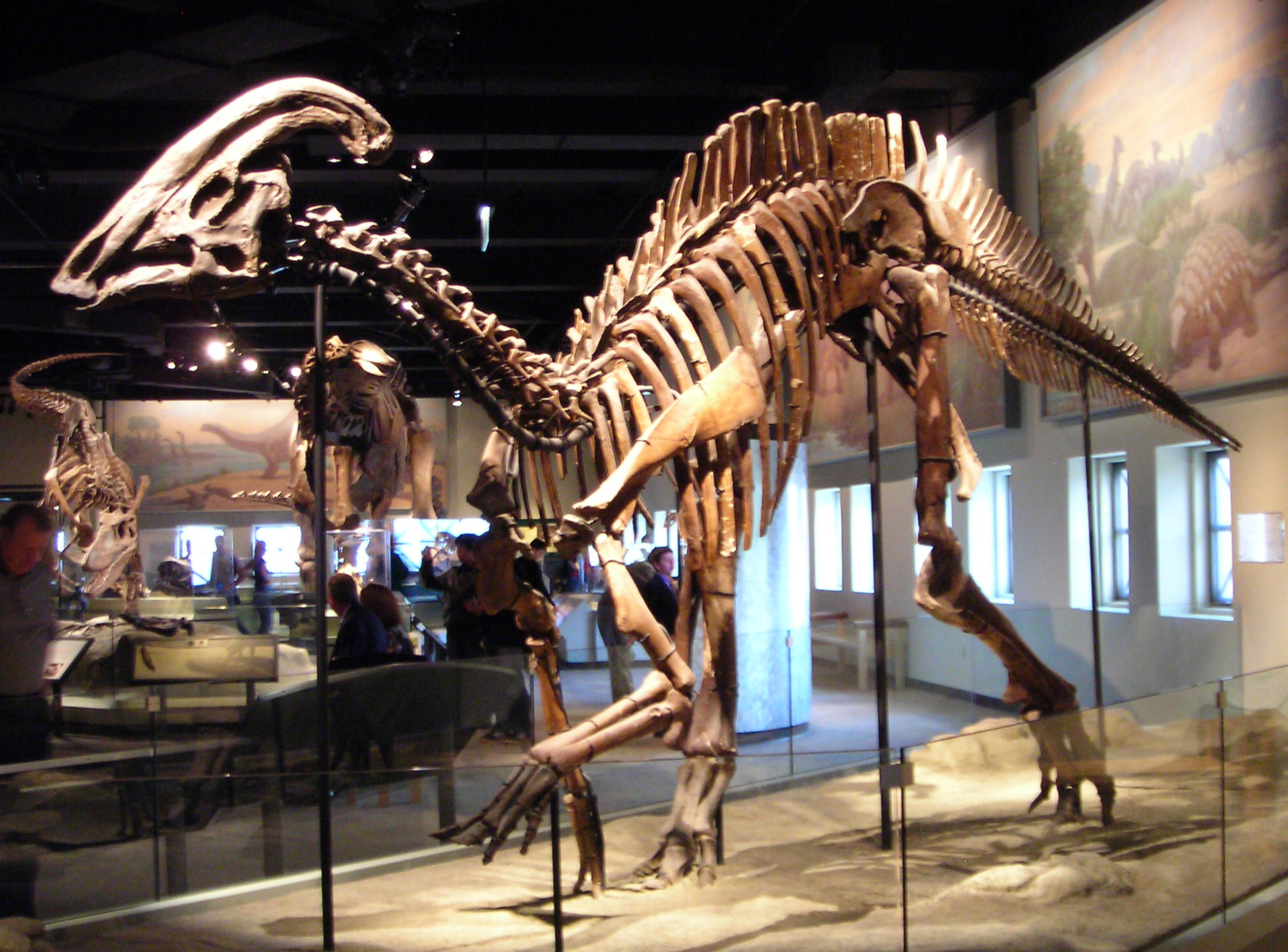
Parasaurolophus, a crested hadrosaur.

Hadrosaurids, also commonly referred to as duck-billed dinosaurs or hadrosaurs, were large terrestrial herbivores. Their diet remains a subject of debate among paleontologists, especially regarding whether hadrosaurids were grazers who fed on vegetation close to the ground, or browsers who ate higher-growing leaves and twigs. Preserved stomach content findings have indicated they may have been browsers, whereas other studies into jaw movements indicate they may have been grazers.

The mouth of a hadrosaur had hundreds of tiny teeth packed into dental batteries. These teeth were continually replaced with new teeth. Hadrosaur beaks were used to cut food, either by stripping off leaves or by cropping. It is believed hadrosaurs had cheeks in order to keep food in the mouth.

Researchers have long believed their unusual mouth mechanics may have played a role in their evolutionary success. However, because they lack the complex flexible lower jaw joint of today's mammals, it has been difficult for scientists to determine exactly how the hadrosaurs broke down their food and ate. Without this understanding, it had been impossible to form a complete understanding of the Late Cretaceous ecosystems and how they were affected during the Cretaceous–Paleogene extinction event 66 million years ago. It has also remained unclear exactly what hadrosaurids ate. In particular, it has never been definitively proven whether hadrosaurs were grazers who ate vegetation close to the ground, like modern-day sheep or cows, or whether the dinosaurs were browsers who ate higher-growing leaves and twigs, like today's deer or giraffes.

A 2008–2009 study by University of Leicester researchers analyzed hundreds of microscopic scratches on the teeth of a fossilized Edmontosaurus jaw and determined hadrosaurs had a unique way of eating unlike any creature living today. In contrast to a flexible lower jaw joint prevalent in today's mammals, a hadrosaur had a unique hinge between the upper jaws and the rest of its skull. The team found the dinosaur's upper jaws pushed outwards and sideways while chewing, as the lower jaw slid against the upper teeth.

Coprolites (fossilized droppings) of some Late Cretaceous hadrosaurs show that the animals sometimes deliberately ate rotting wood. Wood itself is not nutritious, but decomposing wood would have contained fungi, decomposed wood material and detritus-eating invertebrates, all of which would have been nutritious.

== Early history of research ==
The first hadrosaur finds did not include much skull material. Hadrosaur teeth have been known since the 1850s (Joseph Leidy's Trachodon), and a few fragments of teeth and jaws were among the bones named Hadrosaurus by Leidy in 1858. (The skeletal mount made for Hadrosaurus by Benjamin Waterhouse Hawkins included a speculative iguana-like skull) Leidy had enough skeletal material to make other inferences about the paleobiology of hadrosaurs, though. Of particular importance was the unequal lengths of the forelimbs and hindlimbs. He interpreted his new animal as a kangaroo-like animal that browsed along rivers, using its forelimbs to manipulate branches. His vague inference of amphibious habits would later be expanded upon by Edward Drinker Cope, who contributed the mistaken conclusion that hadrosaur teeth and jaws were weak and suitable only for eating soft water plants.

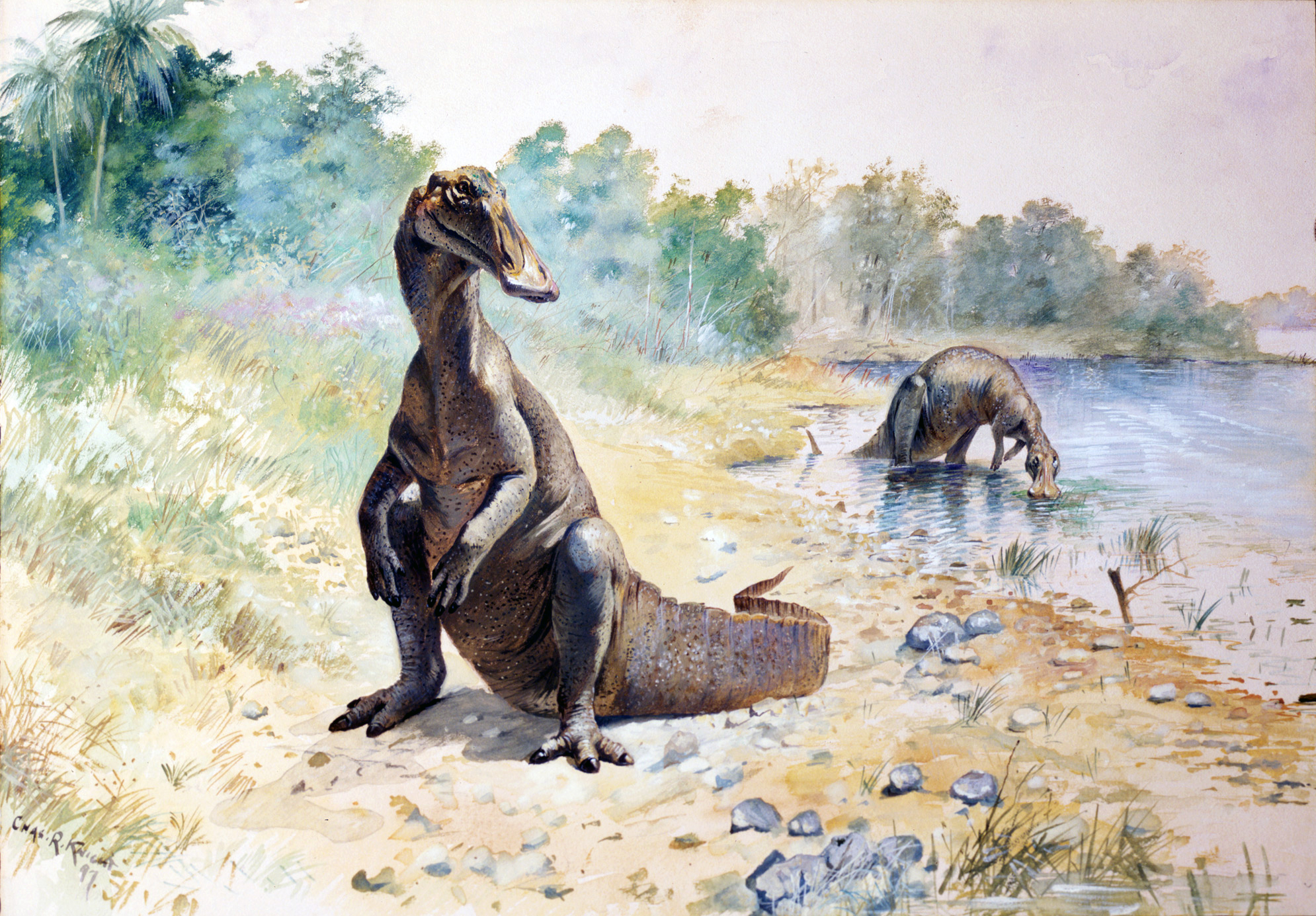
Early restoration by Charles R. Knight of hadrosaurs as semi-aquatic animals that could only chew soft water plants, a popular idea at the time which is now outdated

Cope described the next piece of the puzzle in 1874: a more complete jaw fragment in 1874 he named Cionodon arctatus, which revealed for the first time the complex hadrosaur tooth battery. However, the first essentially complete hadrosaur skull was not described until 1883. It was part of a skeleton (the first essentially complete hadrosaur skeleton as well) collected in 1882 by Dr. J. L. Wortman and R. S. Hill for Cope. Described as a specimen of Diclonius mirabilis, it is now known as Edmontosaurus. Cope immediately drew attention to the anterior part of the skull, which was drawn out, long, and wide. He compared it to that of a goose in side view, and to a short-billed spoonbill in top view. Additionally, he noted the presence of what he interpreted as the remnants of a dermal structure surrounding the beak. Significantly, Cope regarded his Diclonius as an amphibious animal consuming soft water vegetation. His reasoning was that the teeth of the lower jaw were weakly connected to the bone and liable to break off if used to consume terrestrial food, and he described the beak as weak as well. Unfortunately for Cope, aside from misidentifying several of the bones of the skull, by chance the lower jaws he was studying were missing the walls supporting the teeth from the inside; the teeth were actually well-supported. While Cope anticipated publishing a full report with illustrations, he never did so, and instead the first accurate illustrated description of a hadrosaur skull and skeleton would be produced by his great rival, Othniel Charles Marsh. While Marsh corrected several anatomical errors, he retained Cope's postulated diet of soft plants. The description of hadrosaurs as amphibious eaters of aquatic plants became so ingrained that when the first possible case of hadrosaur gut contents was described in 1922 and found to be made up of terrestrial plants, the author made a point of noting that the specimen only established that hadrosaurs could eat land plants as well as water plants.

=== Lull and Wright (1942) ===
The early study of hadrosaurid dietary adaptations and feeding behavior was summarized in a 1942 monograph by Richard Swann Lull and Nelda Wright. Unlike previous authors, they moved away from soft water plants as the major part of the diet, but retained the interpretation of an amphibious lifestyle. They drew attention to the extensive development of the hadrosaurid dental batteries, and compared their dental equipment to that of horses, noting the advantage the dinosaurs had in continual replacement of teeth. However, they found the purpose of the dental batteries uncertain: hadrosaur jaws were unlike those of any modern reptiles, and there did not appear to be an evolutionary pressure on hadrosaurids like grasses were for horses. Lull and Wright eliminated the soft plants as the primary choice of diet, and eliminated grasses on the grounds that the beak was unlike that of grazing birds like geese, and that the quantity of available grasses appeared insufficient to feed hadrosaurids. Instead, they proposed equisetaleans (horsetails) as the major food source, as these plants existed in the same times and places as hadrosaurids, are known to be rich in starch, and contain abrasive silica which would necessitate teeth that could be replaced. Softer land and water plants were proposed as secondary foods. Lull and Wright found that their proposed feeding ecology was comparable to that of a modern moose, which browses on trees and feeds on water plants in wetlands. They further interpreted the complex anatomy of hadrosaurid snouts and nasal passages as adaptations to feeding underwater, like moose.

Lull and Wright added a new element to hadrosaurid feeding by proposing the presence of muscles analogous to mammalian cheek muscles, which would hold in food chopped by the teeth. These muscles would be attached on bony ridges present on the upper and lower jaws. The authors interpreted the action of the jaws as limited to simple up–and–down motions, finding forward–backward motion unlikely based on skull articulation. The vertical motion would cut food into short lengths, and the pieces would be retained by the cheeks. To manipulated the food in the cheeks, the authors inferred the presence of a well-developed tongue.

=== Ostrom (1964) and reception ===
The general preexisting consensus on hadrosaurid paleobiology was challenged in 1964 by John Ostrom, who found little evidence to support either a diet of aquatic plants or an amphibious lifestyle. Unlike previous depictions, he interpreted hadrosaurids as terrestrial foragers that browsed on land plants, not aquatic plants. Like Lull and Wright, he drew attention to the robust dental batteries, and found that hard, resistant foods were the most likely diet (such as woody, silica–rich, or fibrous materials). Unlike Lull and Wright, he interpreted hadrosaur jaws as using a complex rodent–like forward–backward grinding motion, and did not comment on the possibility of cheeks. Drawing on an older proposal made during study of a hadrosaur specimen with a preserved beak, he noted the possibility that the animals stripped leaves and shoots from branches by closing the beak over branches and pulling back. A terrestrial diet was also supported by the 1922 gut content study, which found conifer needles and twigs, seeds, and fruits inside the specimen. There was also more circumstantial evidence for terrestrial feeding. Ostrom found that hadrosaurid skeletal anatomy indicated that the animals were well–adapted to move on land, and were well–supported by ossified tendons along the vertebral spines, which would have hindered swimming. He also reported that aquatic plant pollen was rare in the rock units hadrosaurids are known from, which indicates that aquatic plants were uncommon.

== 1984 hadrosaurid chewing hypothesis ==
In 1984, David B. Weishampel proposed a new hypothesis on how hadrosaurids fed. His study of the sutures between bones in fossil skulls concluded that ornithopods, a group of bird-hipped dinosaurs that includes hadrosaurids, had flexible upper jaws and that when the lower jaw clamped shut, pressure would spread outward from both sides of the upper jaw. The upper teeth would grind against the lower teeth like rasps, trapping the plants and grinding them up. The theory remained largely unproven until the study by Purnell, Williams and Barrett, which Science magazine called, "The strongest independent evidence yet for this unique jaw motion". However, in 2008, a group of American and Canadian researchers, led by vertebrate paleobiologist Natalia Rybczynski, replicated Weishampel's proposed chewing motion using a computerized three-dimensional animation model. Rybczynski et al. believe Weishampel's model may not be viable, and plan to test other hypotheses.

== 2008 preserved stomach content findings ==
In 2008, a team led by University of Colorado at Boulder graduate student Justin S. Tweet found a homogeneous accumulation of millimeter-scale leaf fragments in the gut region of a well-preserved partially grown Brachylophosaurus. As a result of that finding, Tweet concluded in September 2008 that the animal was likely a browser, not a grazer.

== 2008–2009 hadrosaur chewing study by Williams et al. ==
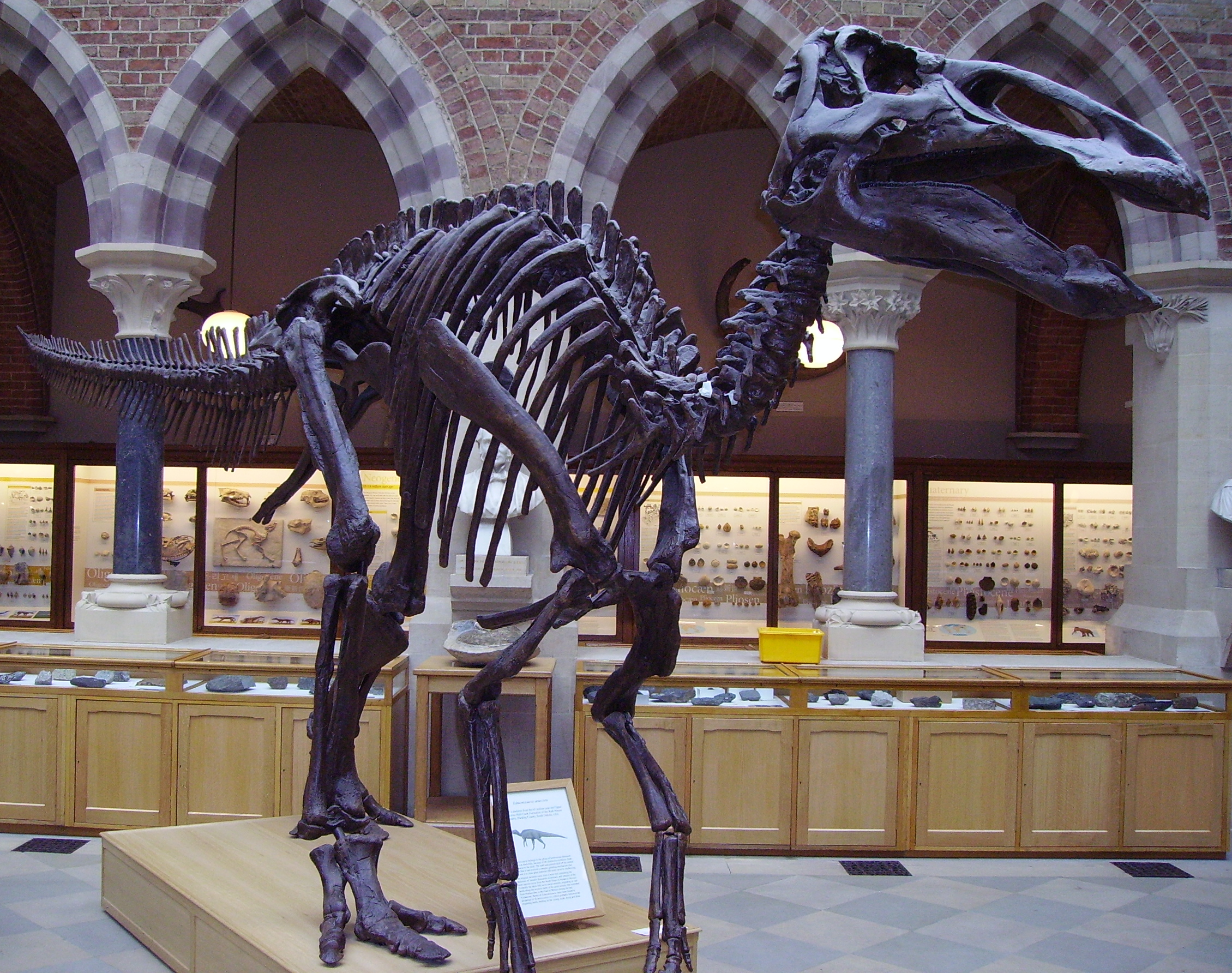
Researchers studied microscopic scratches on the fossilized jawbone of an Edmontosaurus (pictured), and concluded that duck-billed dinosaurs likely grazed on vegetation close to the ground and had a way of chewing unlike any modern animal.

A study into exactly how a hadrosaur broke down and ate its food was conducted by Vince Williams, a graduate student at the University of Leicester; Paul Barrett, a paleontologist with London's Natural History Museum; and Mark Purnell, a British paleontologist from the geology department of the University of Leicester. The three men employed a new approach to analyze the feeding mechanisms of dinosaurs, and thus help understand their place in the prehistoric ecosystems. Chewing on solid food always leaves tiny scratches on the teeth's surfaces. The trio believed that by looking at the size and orientation of those markings on hadrosaurid teeth, they would be able to learn about the movements of their jaws. Purnell said although he believed this form of study could help determine how and what the hadrosaur ate, he said no previous studies had ever employed this type of analysis.

Williams, Barrett, and Purnell conducted their study using the jaws of an Edmontosaurus, a hadrosaurid that lived between 68 and 66 million years ago in what is now the United States and Canada. The specific Edmontosaurus jaw used in this study was collected from Late Cretaceous rocks found in the United States. The individual teeth on the jaw contained multiple hundreds of microscopic scratches, which had been preserved intact during fossilization. The researchers carefully cleaned the jaws, molded them and coated them with gold to make a detailed replica of the tooth surface. Then they used a scanning electron microscope to give high-power magnification of the scratches for study, and conducted a three-dimensional statistical analysis of the direction of the scratches.

The study found that the hadrosaur chewed using a method completely different from any creature living today, and utilized a type of jaw that is now extinct. The study found the Edmontosaurus jaw had four different sets of parallel scratches running in different directions. Purnell concluded each set of scratches related to a specific jaw movement. This revealed the movement of hadrosaurs was complex and employed movement in several different directions, including up-and-down, front-to-back and sideways movements. The trio concluded that in contrast to the flexible lower jaw joint prevalent in modern mammals, the hadrosaur had a hinge between its upper jaws and the rest of its skull. According to the study, the hadrosaur would push its upper jaws outwards and sideways, while the lower teeth slid against the upper teeth. As the tooth surfaces slid sideways across each other, the food would be ground and shredded before consumption. Purnell said the style of eating, "was not a scissor-like movement; it seems that these dinosaurs invented their own way of chewing." Although the upper-jaw teeth hinged outward when the hadrosaur ate, Purnell said it was likely the dinosaur could still chew with its mouth closed. While the outward flexure of the upper jaws might have been visible, Purnell said the chewing was likely concealed by the hadrosaur's cheeks and probably looked "quite subtle".

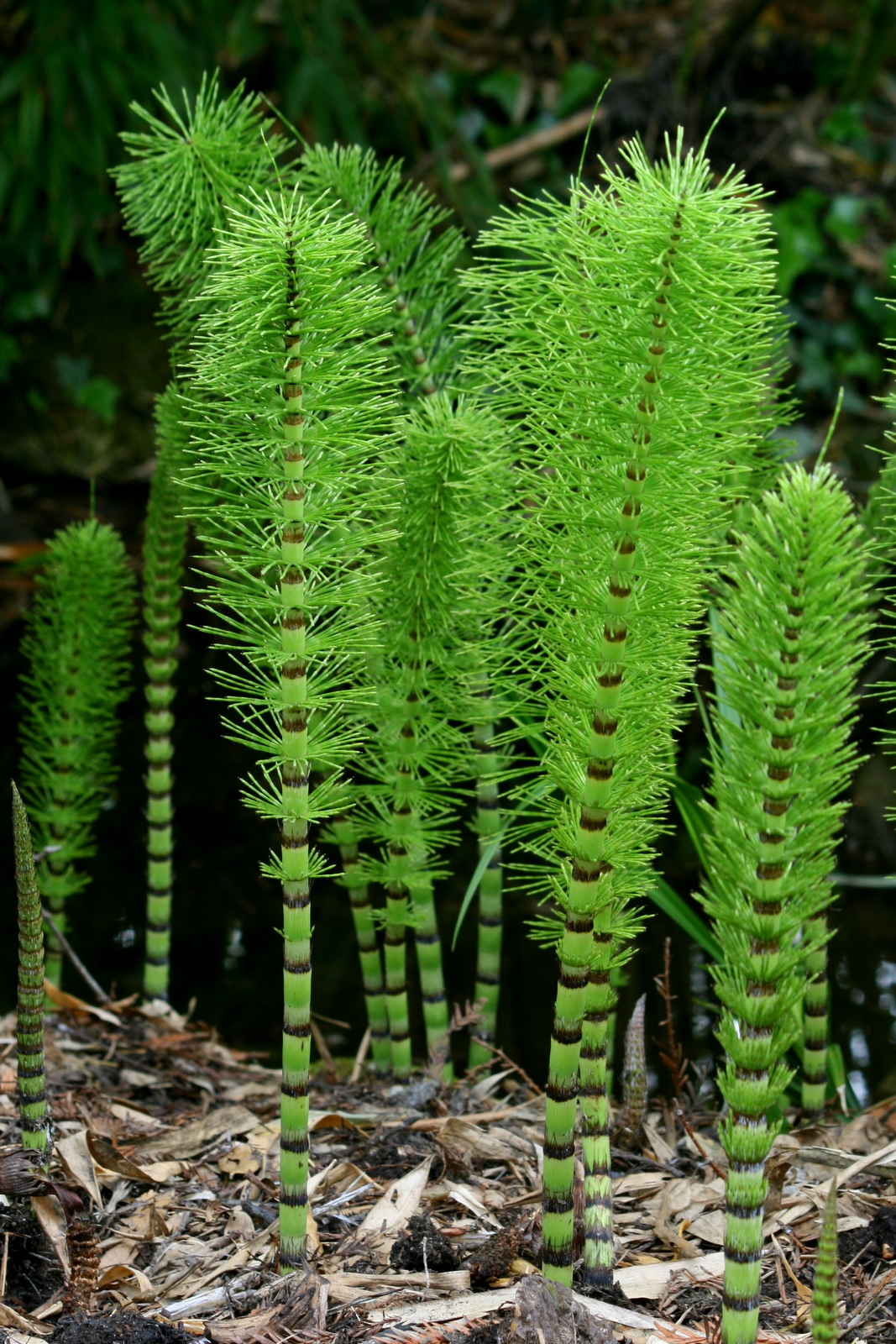
An extant horsetail, Equisetum telmateia

The study also made conclusions about what hadrosaurids ate, although Purnell cautioned the conclusions about the hadrosaur's diet were "a little less secure than the very good evidence we have for the motions of the teeth relative to each other." The scratches found on each individual tooth were so equal that measuring an area of just one square millimeter was enough to sample the whole jaw. The team concluded the evenness of the scratches suggested the hadrosaur used the same series of jaw motions over and over again. As a result, the study determined that the hadrosaur diet was probably made of leaves and lacked the bulkier items such as twigs or stems, which might have required a different chewing method and created different wear patterns. The lack of pit marks on the teeth also upheld these conclusions, and suggested the hadrosaurs likely grazed on low-lying vegetation that lacked pits, rather than browsing on higher-growing vegetation with twigs. The scratches also indicated the hadrosaur's food contained either small particles of grit, which was normal for vegetation cropped close to the ground, or that it contained microscopic granules of silica, which is common in grass. Grasses had evolved by the Late Cretaceous period, but were not particularly common, so the study concluded it probably did not play a major component in the hadrosaur's diet. Instead, they believed horsetails, a common plant at the time containing the above characteristics, was probably an important food for the dinosaur. The results of the study were published online on June 30, 2009, in The Proceedings of the National Academy of Sciences, the official journal of the United States National Academy of Sciences. The study was published under the title, "Quantitative analysis of dental microwear in hadrosaurid dinosaurs, and the implications for hypotheses of jaw mechanics and feeding".

It was the first quantitative analysis of tooth microwear in dinosaurs. Purnell said the technique employed in the study was equally important as the findings themselves, and that the study proved analyzing microscopic scratch marks on teeth can provide reliable information about an animal's diet and chewing mechanism. Purnell said this method could be used to study other areas of scientific research, including the dietary habits of other long-vanished species including dinosaurs, extinct groups of fish or very early mammals. Purnell said the findings were further significant not only for the basic understanding of how hadrosaurids ate, but also because a lack of such understanding from those dinosaurs represented a "big gap in our knowledge" of the ecosystem of the late Cretaceous. Because hadrosaurs were the dominant terrestrial herbivores of that time, they played a major role in structure the ecosystem of the Late Cretaceous period. Purnell said, "The more we understand the ecosystems of the past, and how they were affected by global events like climate change, the better we can understand how changes now are going to pan out in the future." Lawrence Witmer, a paleontologist with Ohio University College of Osteopathic Medicine in Athens, called the study, "One of the best microwear papers I've seen", although he said he was not yet convinced the hadrosaurid upper jaw could flex.

The hypothesis that hadrosaurs were likely grazers rather than browsers appears to contradict previous findings from preserved stomach contents found in the fossilized guts in previous hadrosaurs studies. In response to such findings, Purnell said preserved stomach contents are questionable because they do not necessarily represent the usual diet of the animal. Alan Boyle, a journalist and MSNBC science editor who reported on the team's findings, said of the apparent contradictions between Williams et al..'s study and previous stomach content findings are subject to debate, but do not necessarily render Williams et al..'s study irrelevant or incorrect. Specifically, Boyle said, "the claims about grazing vs. browsing are certainly not conclusive (but) the researcher's surmise is that they were more likely to graze". Williams et al..'s hypothesis of hadrosaurids as grazers who ate vegetation close to the ground, rather than browsing higher-growing leaves and twigs, would also contradict the portrayal of hadrosaurs in Jurassic Park, the 1990 science fiction novel by Michael Crichton.

== See also ==
- Timeline of hadrosaur research
