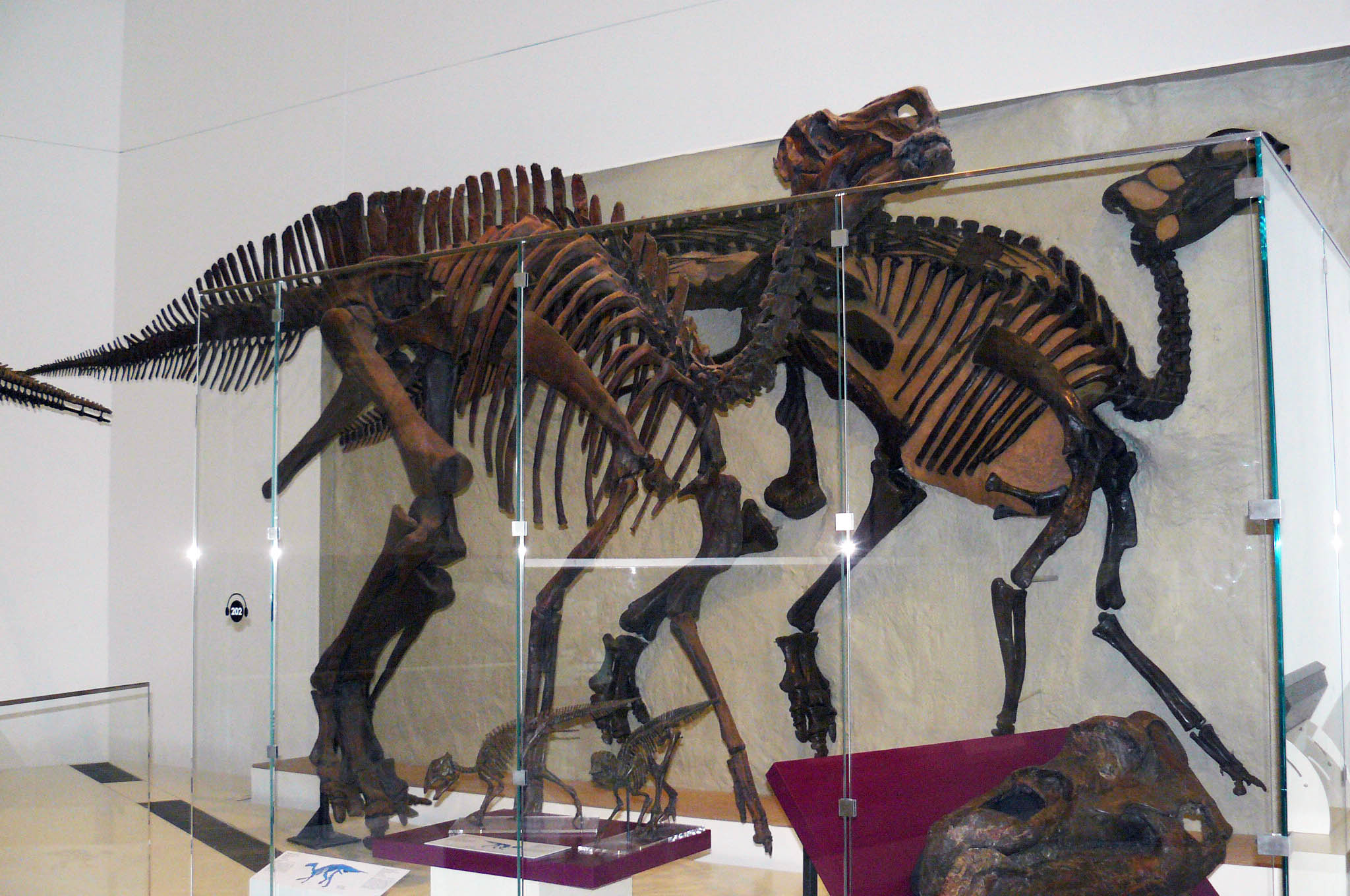
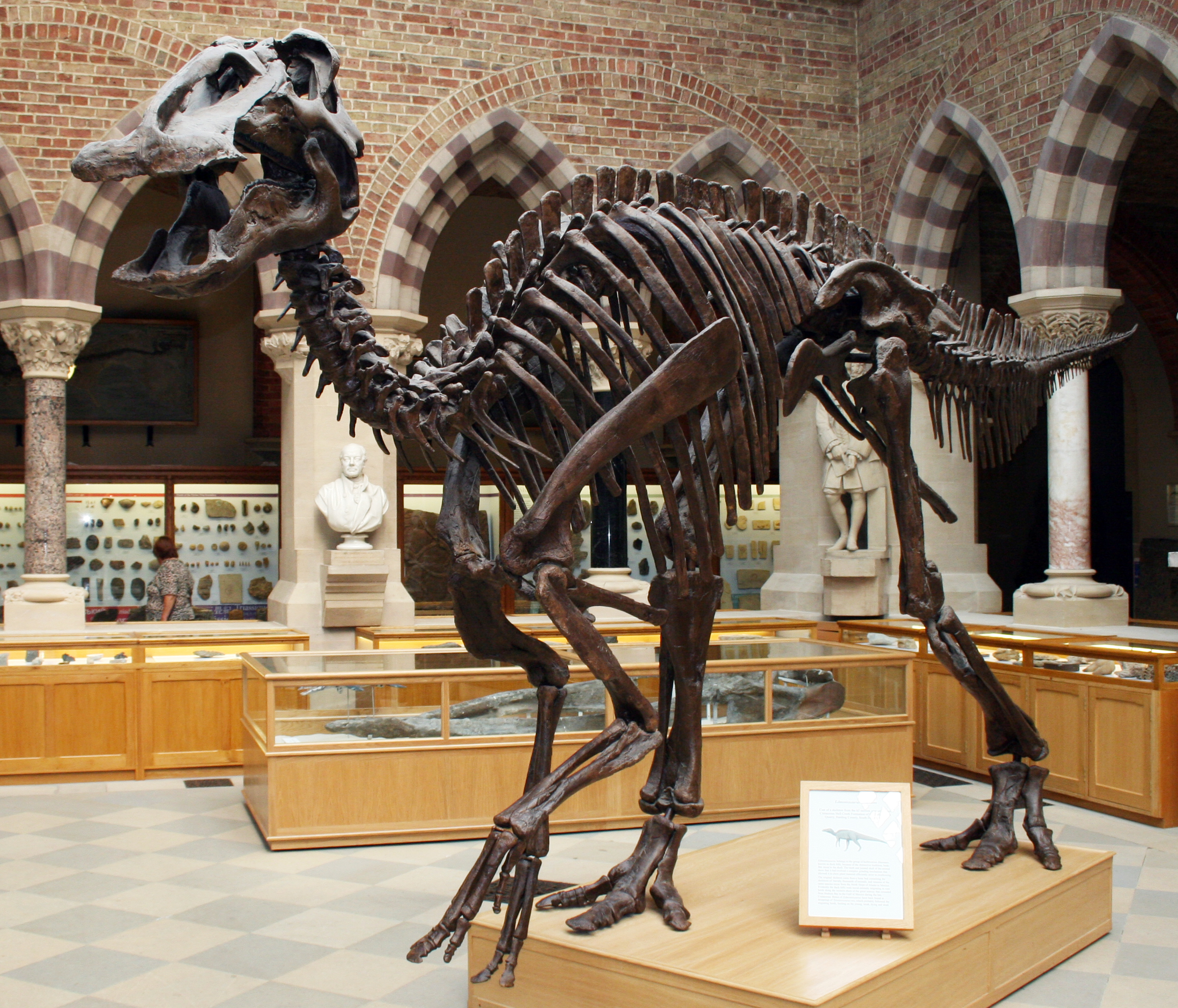
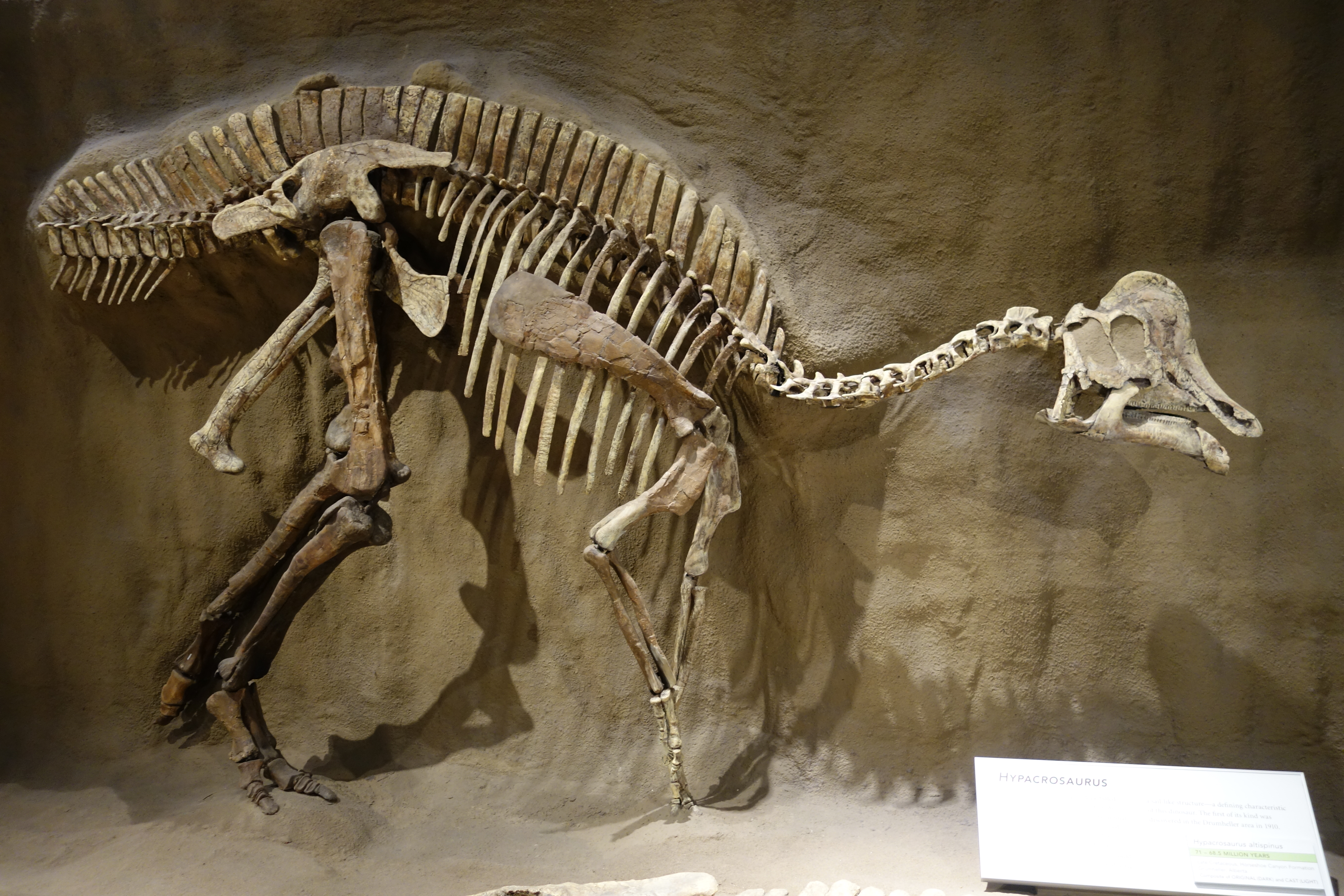
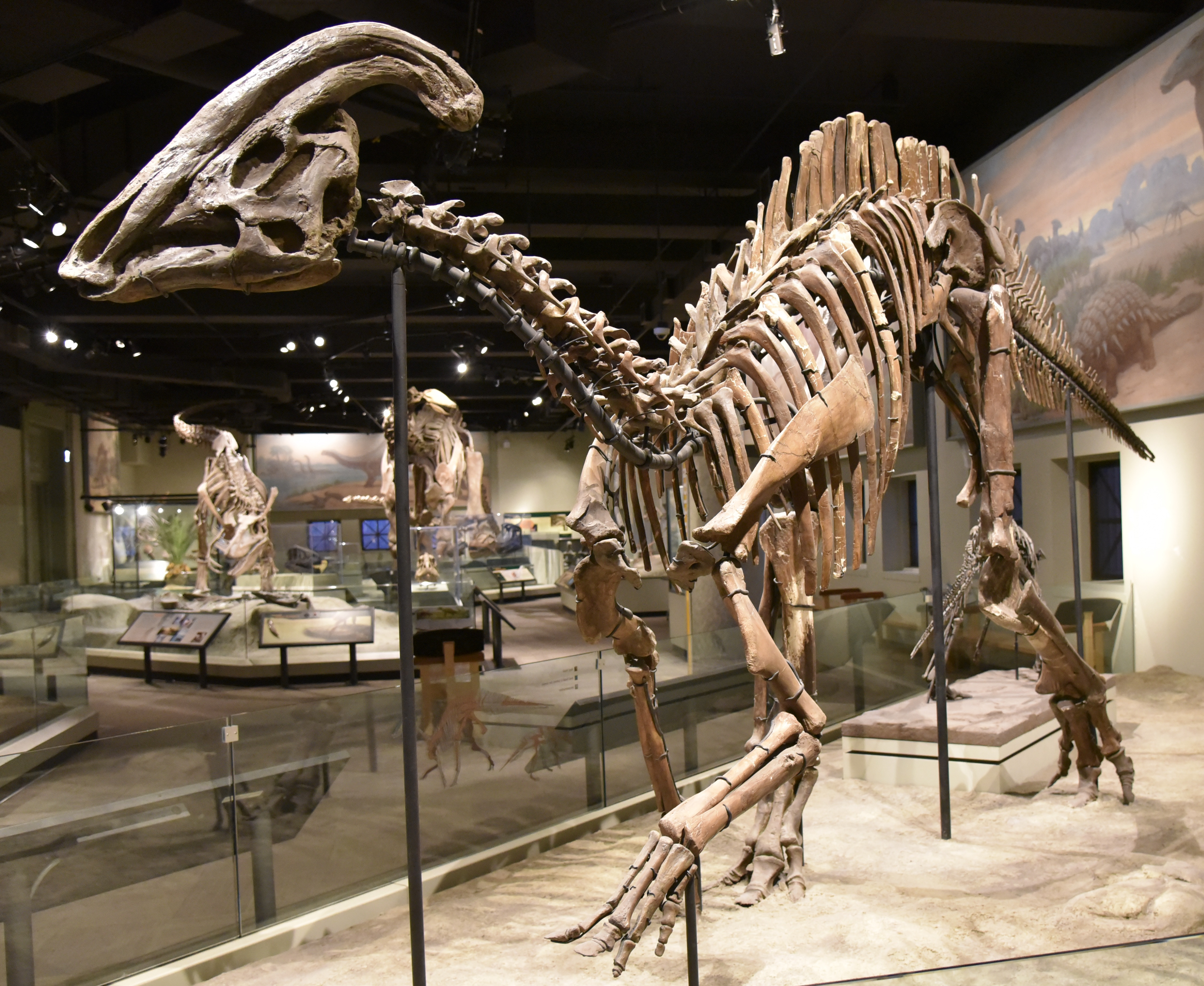
- Four hadrosaurs. Clockwise from top left: Maiasaura (front), Gryposaurus (back), Edmontosaurus (all saurolophines), Parasaurolophus, and Hypacrosaurus (both lambeosaurs)

Scientific classification
- Kingdom: Animalia
- Phylum: Chordata
- Class: Reptilia
- Clade: Dinosauria
- Clade: †Ornithischia
- Clade: †Ornithopoda
- Clade: †Hadrosauromorpha
- Family: †Hadrosauridae; Cope, 1869

Type species
- †Hadrosaurus foulkii Leidy, 1858

Subgroups
- †Aquilarhinus; †Eotrachodon; †Fylax?; †Gobihadros?; †Hadrosaurus; †Lapampasaurus; †Latirhinus; †Lophorhothon?; †Malefica; †Penelopognathus?; †Plesiohadros?; †Yamatosaurus; †Euhadrosauria/Saurolophidae; †Lambeosaurinae; †Saurolophinae

Synonyms
- Trachodontidae (Lydekker, 1888); Saurolophidae (Brown, 1914); Lambeosauridae (Parks, 1923); Cheneosauridae (Lull & Wright, 1942); Ornithotarsidae (Cope, 1871)

= Hadrosauridae =

Hadrosaurids Temporal range: Late Cretaceous, 86.3–66 Ma

Extinct family of dinosaurs

Hadrosauridae (from Ancient Greek ἁδρός (hadrós) 'stout, thick' and σαύρα (saúra) 'lizard'), is a family of ornithischian dinosaurs informally referred to as duck-billed dinosaurs. This group is known as the duck-billed dinosaurs for the flat duck-bill appearance of the bones in their snouts. The ornithopod family, which includes genera such as Edmontosaurus and Parasaurolophus, was a common group of herbivores during the Late Cretaceous Period. Hadrosaurids are descendants of the Late Jurassic/Early Cretaceous iguanodontian dinosaurs and had a similar body layout. Hadrosaurs were among the most dominant herbivores during the Late Cretaceous in Asia and North America, and during the close of the Cretaceous several lineages dispersed into Europe, Africa, South America and possibly Antarctica.

Like other ornithischians, hadrosaurids had a predentary bone and a pubic bone which was positioned backwards in the pelvis. Unlike more primitive iguanodonts, the teeth of hadrosaurids are stacked into complex structures known as dental batteries, which acted as effective grinding surfaces. Hadrosauridae is divided into two principal subfamilies: the lambeosaurines (Lambeosaurinae), which had hollow cranial crests or tubes; and the saurolophines (Saurolophinae), identified as hadrosaurines (Hadrosaurinae) in most pre-2010 works, which lacked hollow cranial crests (solid crests were present in some forms). Saurolophines tended to be bulkier than lambeosaurines. Lambeosaurines included the aralosaurins, tsintaosaurins, lambeosaurins and parasaurolophins, while saurolophines included the brachylophosaurins, kritosaurins, saurolophins and edmontosaurins.

Hadrosaurids were facultative bipeds, with the young of some species walking mostly on two legs and the adults walking mostly on four.

== History of discovery ==
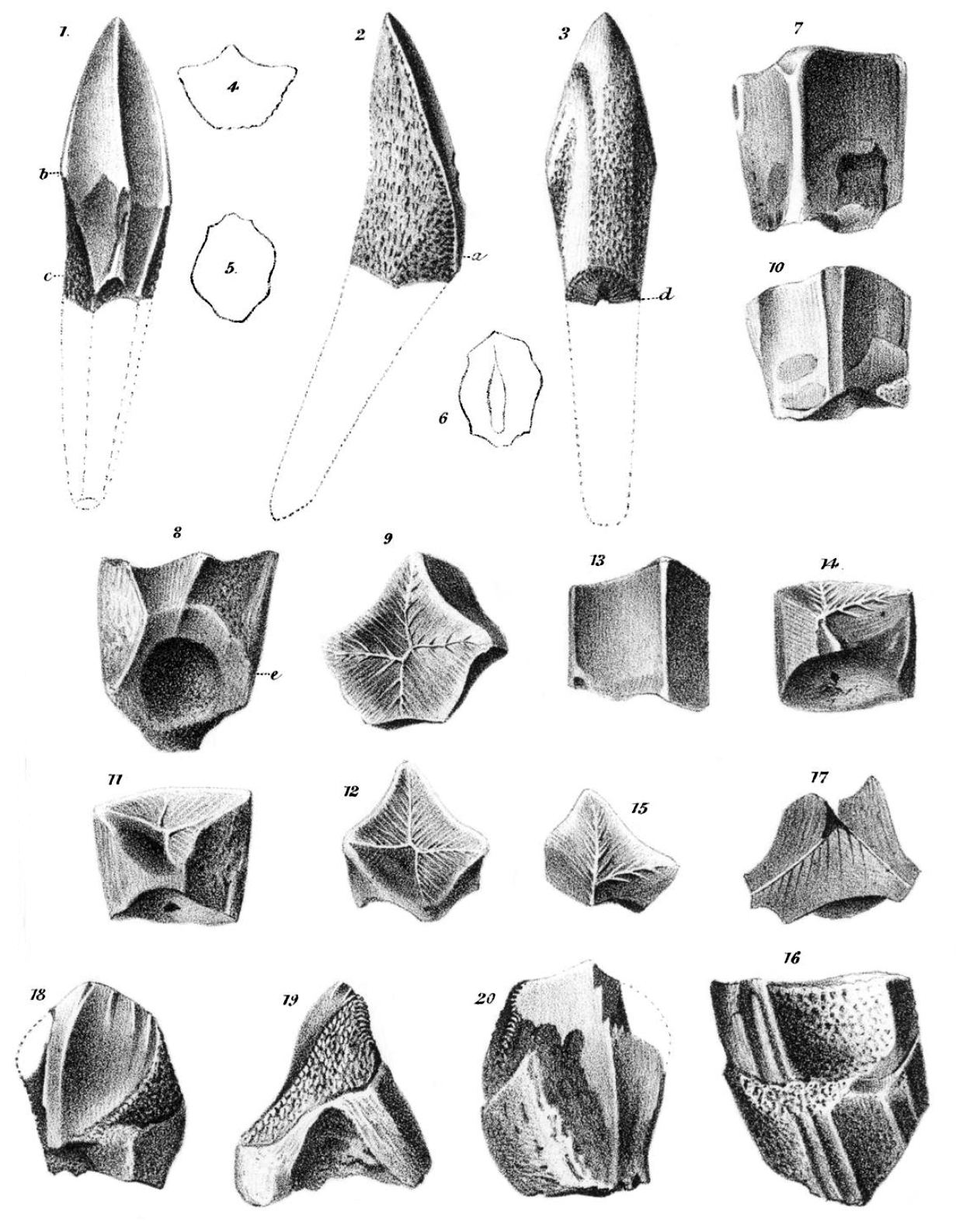
Illustration of Trachodon mirabilis teeth

Ferdinand Vandeveer Hayden, during expeditions near the Judith River in 1854 through 1856, discovered the very first dinosaur fossils recognized from North America. These specimens were obtained by Joseph Leidy, who described and named them in 1856; two of the several species named were Trachodon mirabilis of the Judith River Formation and Thespesius occidentalis of the "Great Lignite Formation". The former was based on a collection of teeth whilst the latter on two caudal centra and a phalanx. Although most of the Trachodon teeth turned out to belong to ceratopsids, the holotype and remains of T. occidentalis would come to be recognized as the first recognized hadrosaur specimens. Around the same time in Philadelphia, on the other side of the continent, geologist William Parker Foulke was informed of numerous large bones accidentally uncovered by farmer John E. Hopkins some twenty years earlier. Foulke obtained permission to investigate the now scattered fossils in 1858, and these specimens as well were given to Leidy. They were described in the same year as Hadrosaurus foulkii, giving a slightly better picture of the form of a hadrosaur. Leidy provided additional description in a 1865 paper. Among his 1858 work Leidy briefly suggested that the animal was likely amphibious in nature; this school of thought about hadrosaurs would come to be dominant for over a century to come.

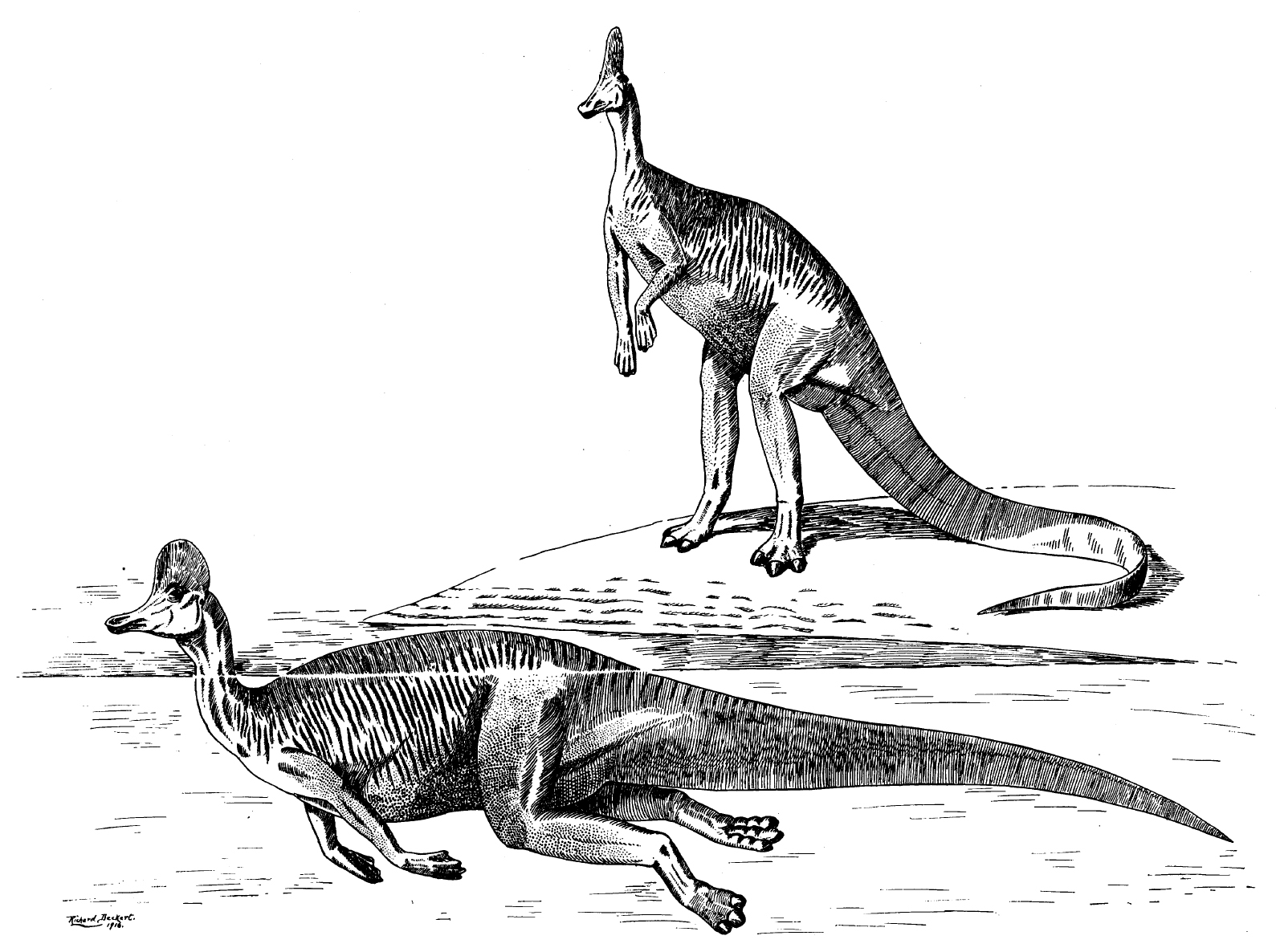
From the mid 19th century through much of the 20th century, hadrosaurs were considered aquatic animals which subsisted on soft water plants

Further discoveries such as "Hadrosaurus minor" and "Ornithotarsus immanis" would come from the East, and Edward Drinker Cope led an expedition to the Judith River Formation where Trachodon was found. Upon the fragments discovered he named seven new species in two genera, as well as assigning material to Hadrosaurus. Cope had studied the jaws of hadrosaurs and come to the conclusion that the teeth were fragile and could have been dislodged incredibly easily. As such, he supposed the animals must have fed largely on soft water plants; he presented this idea to the Philadelphia Academy in 1883, and this idea would come to be very influential on future study. Research would continue in the Judith River area for years to come, but the formation never yielded much more than fragmentary remains, and Cope's species as well as Trachodon itself would in time be seen as of doubtful validity. The Eastern states, too, would never yield particularly informative specimens. Instead, other sites in the American West would come to provide many very complete specimens that would form the backbone of hadrosaur research. One such specimen was the very complete AMNH 5060 (belonging to Edmontosaurus annectens), recovered in 1908 by the fossil collector Charles Hazelius Sternberg and his three sons in Converse County, Wyoming. It was described by Henry Osborn in 1912, who dubbed it the "Dinosaur mummy". This specimen's skin was almost completely preserved in the form of impressions. The skin around its hands, thought to represent webbing, was seen as further bolstering the idea that hadrosaurs were very aquatic animals.

Cope had planned to write a monograph about the group Ornithopoda, but never made much progress towards it before his death. This unrealized endeavor would come to be the inspiration for Richard Swann Lull and Nelda Wright to work on a similar project decades later. Eventually they realized the whole of Ornithopoda was too broad of a scope, until eventually it was narrowed down to specifically North American hadrosaurs. Their monograph, Hadrosaurian Dinosaurs of North America, was published in 1942, and looked back at the whole of understanding about the family. It was designed as a definitive work, covering all aspects of their biology and evolution, and as part of it every known species was re-evaluated and many of them redescribed. They agreed with prior authors on the semi-aquatic nature of hadrosaurs, but re-evaluated Cope's idea of weak jaws and found quite the opposite. The teeth were rooted in strong batteries and would be continuously replaced to prevent them getting worn down. Such a system seemed incredibly overbuilt for the job of eating soft Mesozoic plants, and this fact confused the authors. Though they still proposed a diet of water plants, they considered it likely this would be supplemented by occasional forrays into browsing on land plants.

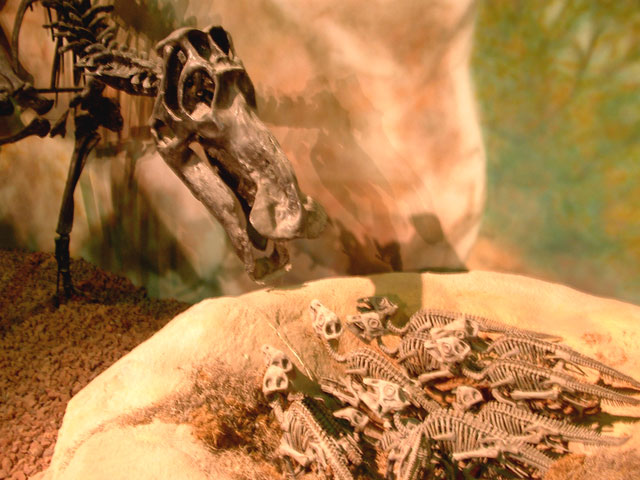
Skeleton of Maiasaura posed with a nest; the naming of this genus was one of numerous important developments in the dinosaur renaissance

Twenty years later, in 1964, another very important work would be published, this time by John H. Ostrom. It challenged the idea that hadrosaurs were semi-aquatic animals, which had been held since the work of Leidy back in the 1850s. This new approach was backed using evidence of the environment and climate they lived in, co-existing flora and fauna, physical anatomy, and preserved stomach contents from mummies. Based on evaluation of all this data, Ostrom found the idea that hadrosaurs were adapted for aquatic life incredibly lacking, and instead proposed they were capable terrestrial animals that browsed on plants such as conifers. He remained uncertain, however, as to the purpose of the paddle-like hand Osborn had described, as well as their long and somewhat paddle-like tails. Thus he agreed with the idea that hadrosaurs would have taken refuge from predators in water. Numerous important studies would follow this; Ostrom's student Peter Dodson published a paper about lambeosaur skull anatomy that made enormous changes to hadrosaur taxonomy in 1975, and Michael K. Brett-Surman conducted a full revision of the group as part of his Graduate studies through the 1970s and 1980s. John R. Horner would also begin to leave his impact on the field, including with the naming of Maiasaura in 1979.

Hadrosaur research experienced a surge in the decade of the 2000s, similar to the research of other dinosaurs. In response to this, the Royal Ontario Museum and the Royal Tyrrell Museum collaborated to arrange the International Hadrosaur Symposium, a professional meeting about ongoing hadrosaur research that was held at the latter institution on September 22 and 23 in 2011. Over fifty presentations were made at the event, thirty-six of which were later incorporated into a book, titled Hadrosaurs, published in 2015. The volume was brought together primarily by palaeontologists David A. Eberth and David C. Evans, and featured an afterword from John R. Horner, all of whom also contributed to one or more of the studies published therein. The first chapter of the volume was a study by David B. Weishampel about the rate of ornithopod research over history, and the interest in different aspects of it over that history, using the 2004 volume The Dinosauria as the source of data on the amount of works published in each decade. Various periods of high and low activity were found, but the twenty-first century was found to overwhelmingly be the most prolific time, with over two-hundred papers published. The advent of the internet was cited as a likely catalyst for this boom. Hadrosaur research experienced high levels of diversity within the decade, with previously uncommon subjects such as growth, phylogeny, and biogeography experiencing more attention, though the functional morphology of hadrosaurids was found to have declined in study since the dinosaur renaissance.

== Distribution ==
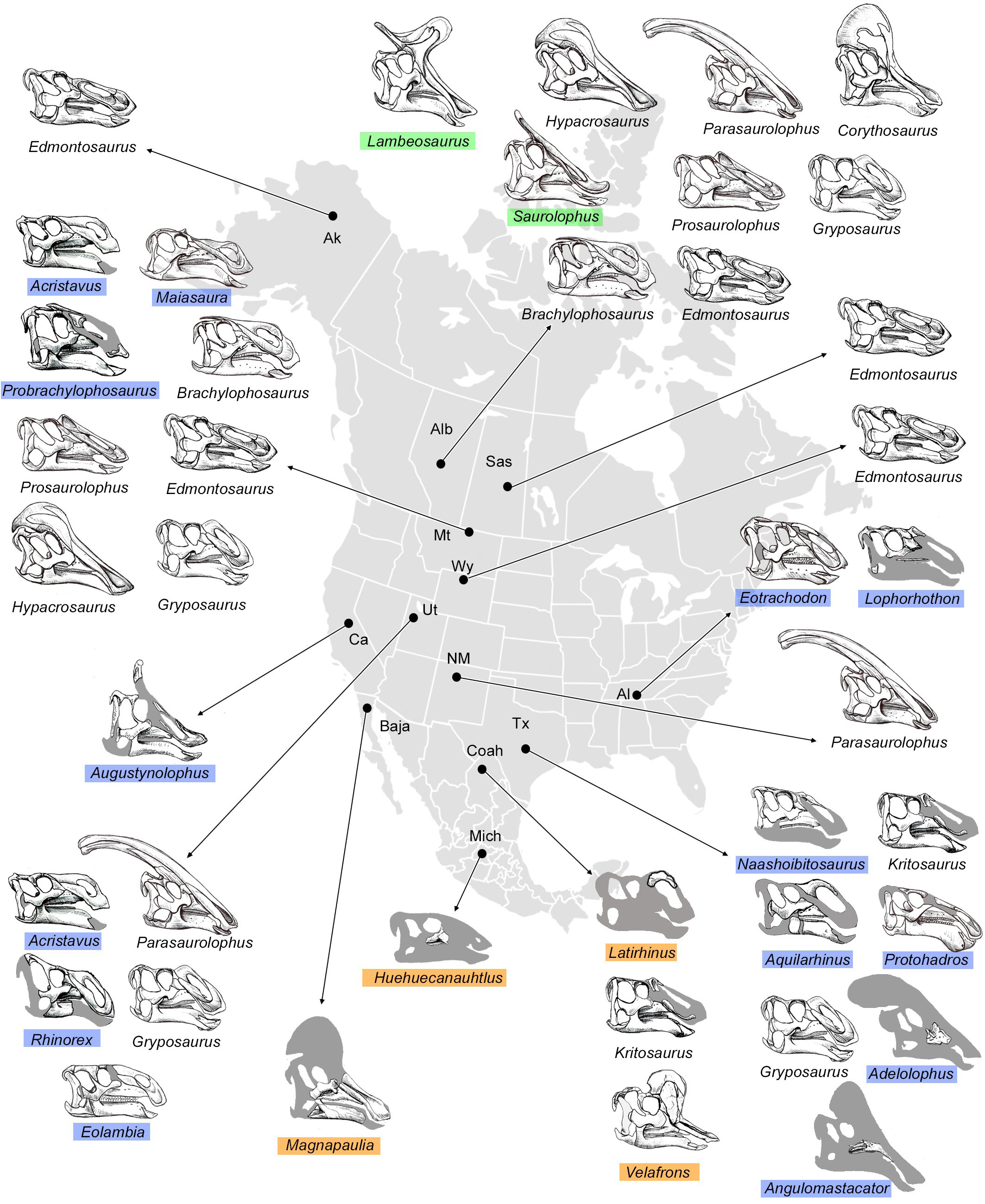
Map of various hadrosaur taxa across North America

Hadrosaurids likely originated in North America, before shortly afterward dispersing into Asia. During the late Campanian-Maastrichtian, a saurolophine hadrosaurid migrated into South America from North America, giving rise to the clade Austrokritosauria, which is closely related to the tribe Kritosaurini. From South America, hadrosaurids may have subsequently dispersed to Antarctica, as evidenced by a tooth and possible metatarsal found in the Antarctic Peninsula, though the metatarsal has been argued to not be diagnostic beyond Ornithopoda, and the tooth may in fact represent a non-hadrosaurid hadrosauroid similar to Gonkoken which is known from the far south of South America. During the late early Maastrichtian, several lineages of Lambeosaurinae from Asia migrated into the European Ibero-Armorican Island (what is now France and Spain), including Arenysaurini and Tsintaosaurini. One of these lineages later dispersed from Europe into North Africa, as evidenced by Ajnabia, a member of Arenysaurini.

== Classification ==
The family Hadrosauridae was first used by Edward Drinker Cope in 1869, then containing only Hadrosaurus. Since its creation, a major division has been recognized in the group between the hollow-crested subfamily Lambeosaurinae and the subfamily Saurolophinae, historically known as Hadrosaurinae. Both of these have been robustly supported in all recent literature. Phylogenetic analysis has increased the resolution of hadrosaurid relationships considerably, leading to the widespread usage of tribes (a taxonomic unit below subfamily) to describe the finer relationships within each group of hadrosaurids.

Lambeosaurines have also been traditionally split into Parasaurolophini and Lambeosaurini. These terms entered the formal literature in Evans and Reisz's 2007 redescription of Lambeosaurus magnicristatus. Lambeosaurini is defined as all taxa more closely related Lambeosaurus lambei than to Parasaurolophus walkeri, and Parasaurolophini as all those taxa closer to P. walkeri than to L. lambei. In recent years Tsintaosaurini and Aralosaurini have also emerged.

The use of the term Hadrosaurinae was questioned in a comprehensive study of hadrosaurid relationships by Albert Prieto-Márquez in 2010. Prieto-Márquez noted that, though the name Hadrosaurinae had been used for the clade of mostly crestless hadrosaurids by nearly all previous studies, its type species, Hadrosaurus foulkii, has almost always been excluded from the clade that bears its name, in violation of the rules for naming animals set out by the ICZN. Prieto-Márquez defined Hadrosaurinae as just the lineage containing H. foulkii, and used the name Saurolophinae instead for the traditional grouping.

=== Phylogeny ===
Hadrosauridae was first defined as a clade, by Forster, in a 1997 abstract, as simply "Lambeosaurinae plus Hadrosaurinae and their most recent common ancestor". In 1998, Paul Sereno defined the clade Hadrosauridae as the most inclusive possible group containing Saurolophus (a well-known saurolophine) and Parasaurolophus (a well-known lambeosaurine), later emending the definition to include Hadrosaurus, the type genus of the family. According to Horner et al. (2004), Sereno's definition would place a few other well-known hadrosaurs (such as Telmatosaurus and Bactrosaurus) outside the family, which led them to define the family to include Telmatosaurus by default. Prieto-Marquez reviewed the phylogeny of Hadrosauridae in 2010, including many taxa potentially within the family. The family is now formally defined in the PhyloCode as "the smallest clade containing Hadrosaurus foulkii, Lambeosaurus lambei, and Saurolophus osborni". The two main subfamilies of Lambeosaurinae and Saurolophinae belong to the clade Euhadrosauria (sometimes called Saurolophidae), defined as "the smallest clade containing Lambeosaurus lambei and Saurolophus osborni, provided it does not include Hadrosaurus foulkii". This clade excludes basal hadrosaurids such as Hadrosaurus and Yamatosaurus but self-destructs if Hadrosaurus is descended from the last common ancestor of Lambeosaurus and Saurolophus.

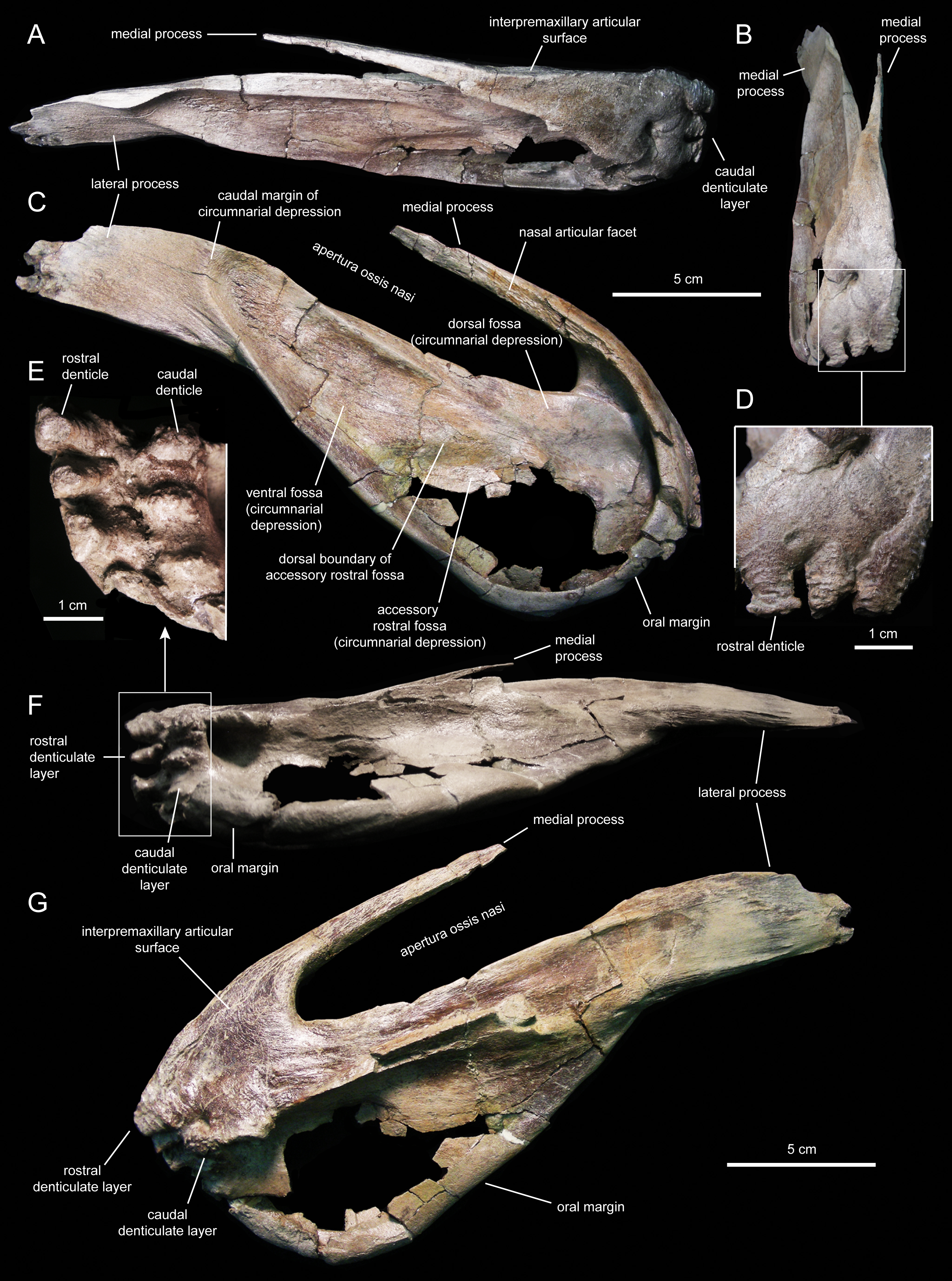
Premaxilla of Eotrachodon, the taxon named by Prieto-Marquez et al. 2016

Below is a cladogram from Prieto-Marquez et al. 2016. This cladogram is a recent modification of the original 2010 analysis, including more characters and taxa. The resulting cladistic tree of their analysis was resolved using Maximum-Parsimony. 61 hadrosauroid species were included, characterized for 273 morphological features: 189 for cranial features and 84 for postcranial features. When characters had multiple states that formed an evolutionary scheme, they were ordered to account for the evolution of one state into the next. The final tree was run through TNT version 1.0.

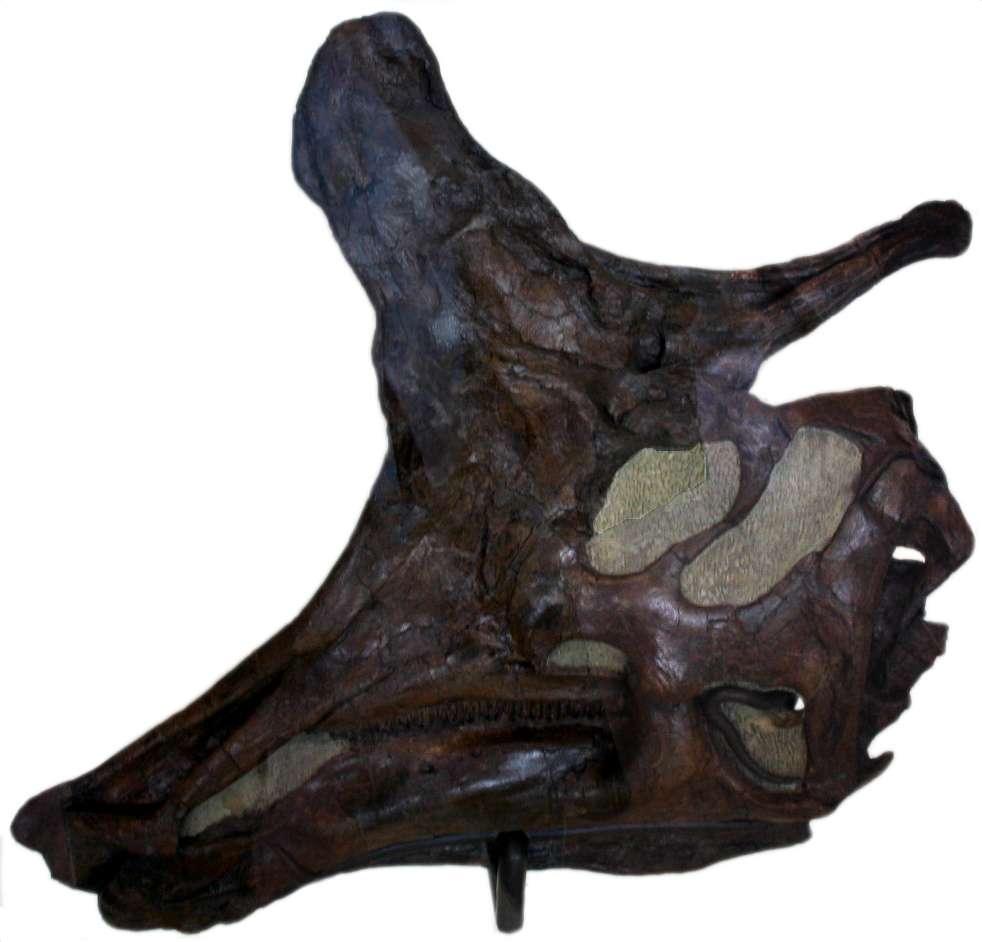
Skull of Lambeosaurus, the type taxon of Lambeosaurinae

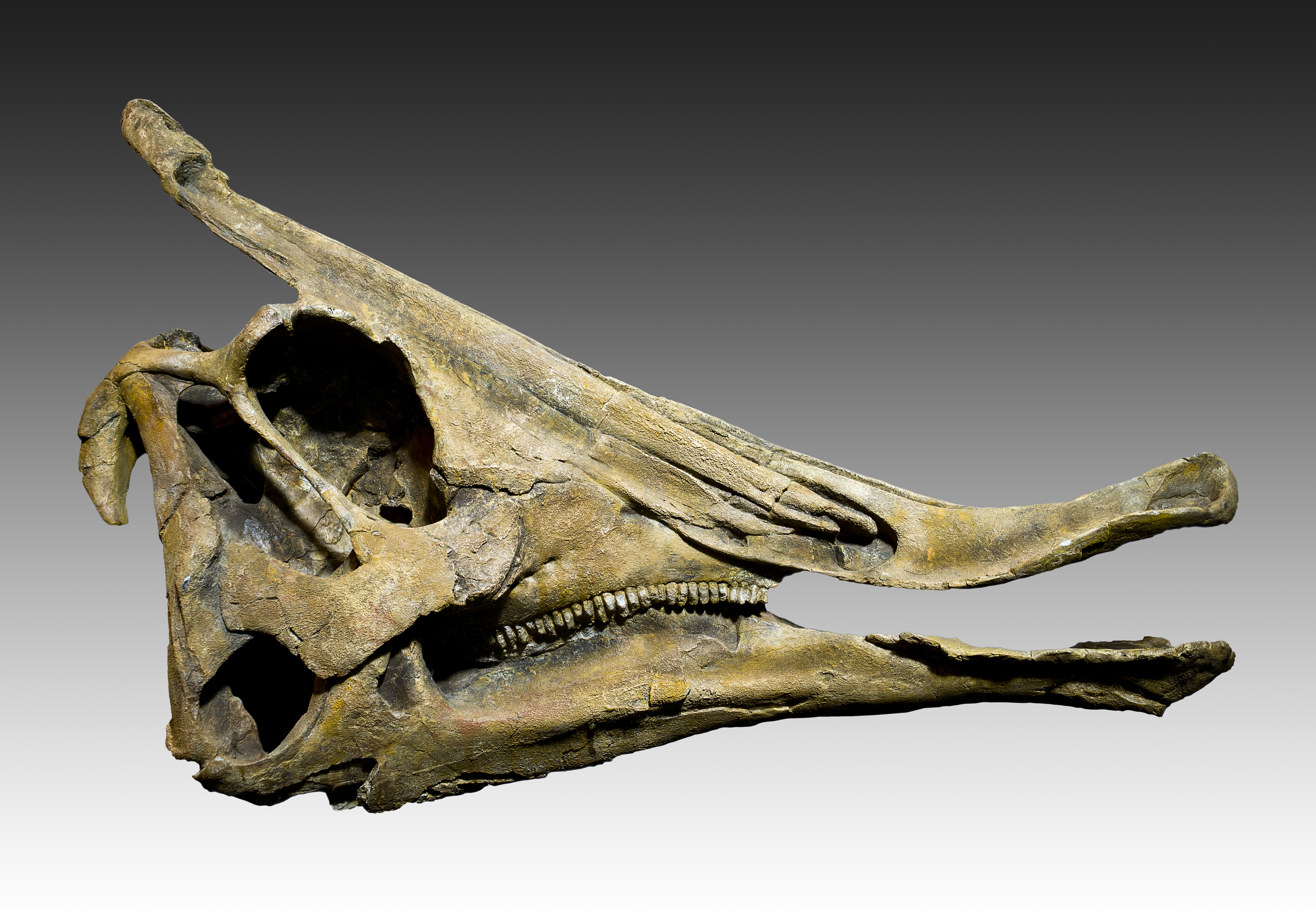
Skull of Saurolophus, the type taxon of Saurolophinae

- - †Telmatosaurus
  - - - †Jintasaurus
      - †Lophorhothon
    - - †Claosaurus
      - - †Tethyshadros
        - †Hadrosauridae
          - †Hadrosaurus
          - - †Eotrachodon
            - †Saurolophidae
              - †Lambeosaurinae
                - †Aralosaurus
                - - †Canardia
                  - †Jaxartosaurus
                  - - - †Tsintaosaurus
                      - †Pararhabdodon
                    - - - †Charonosaurus
                        - †Parasaurolophus
                      - - †Lambeosaurus
                        - - †Corythosaurus
                          - - †Hypacrosaurus stebingeri
                            - - - †Magnapaulia
                                - - †Velafrons
                                  - †Sahaliyania
                              - - †Hypacrosaurus
                                - †Olorotitan
                                - - †Blasisaurus
                                  - †Amurosaurus
              - †Saurolophinae
                - - †Acristavus
                  - †Maiasaura
                  - †Brachylophosaurus
                - - - †Naashoibitosaurus
                    - - †Kritosaurus
                      - - †Gryposaurus
                        - - †Aquilarhinus
                          - - †Secernosaurus
                  - - "†Sabinosaur" PASAC-1
                    - - - †Prosaurolophus
                        - - †Augustynolophus
                          - †Saurolophus
                      - - †Kerberosaurus
                        - - †Kundurosaurus
                          - - †Shantungosaurus
                            - †Edmontosaurus

The following cladogram is from Ramírez-Velasco (2022), including most recently named taxa.

- Hadrosauridae
  - Hadrosaurus
  - - Nanyangosaurus
    - - Eotrachodon
      - - Aquilarhinus
        - - Yamatosaurus
          - Euhadrosauria
            - Saurolophinae
              - Wulagasaurus
              - - Brachylophosaurini
                  - Acristavus
                  - - Maiasaura
                    - - Ornatops
                      - - Brachylophosaurus
                        - Probrachylophosaurus
                - - Kritosaurini
                    - Naashoibitosaurus
                    - - Kritosaurus IGM 6685 (Coahuilasaurus)
                      - - - Kritosaurus horneri
                          - Kritosaurus navajovius
                        - - - Bonapartesaurus
                            - Secernosaurus
                          - - - Gryposaurus monumentensis
                              - Gryposaurus notabilis
                            - - Gryposaurus latidens
                              - Rhinorex
                  - - Saurolophini
                      - Prosaurolophus
                      - - Augustynolophus
                        - Saurolophus spp.
                    - Edmontosaurini
                      - "Sabinosaur" PASAC-1
                      - - - Kamuysaurus
                          - Laiyangosaurus
                        - - Kerberosaurus
                          - - Edmontosaurus spp.
                            - Shantungosaurus
            - Lambeosaurinae
              - Aralosaurus
              - - Tsintaosaurini
                  - Adynomosaurus
                  - - Tsintaosaurus
                    - - Ajnabia
                      - Pararhabdodon
                - - Jaxartosaurus
                  - - Canardia
                    - Corythosauria
                      - Parasaurolophini
                        - Charonosaurus
                        - - Parasaurolophus spp.
                          - - Adelolophus
                            - Tlatolophus
                      - Lambeosaurini
                        - - Amurosaurus
                          - Sahaliyania
                        - - Velafrons
                          - - Latirhinus
                            - - Magnapaulia
                              - - - Hypacrosaurus stebingeri
                                  - - Corythosaurus spp.
                                    - Lambeosaurus spp.
                                - - Angulomastacator
                                  - Hypacrosaurus altispinus
                                  - Olorotitan
                                  - - Arenysaurus
                                    - Blasisaurus

== Anatomy ==
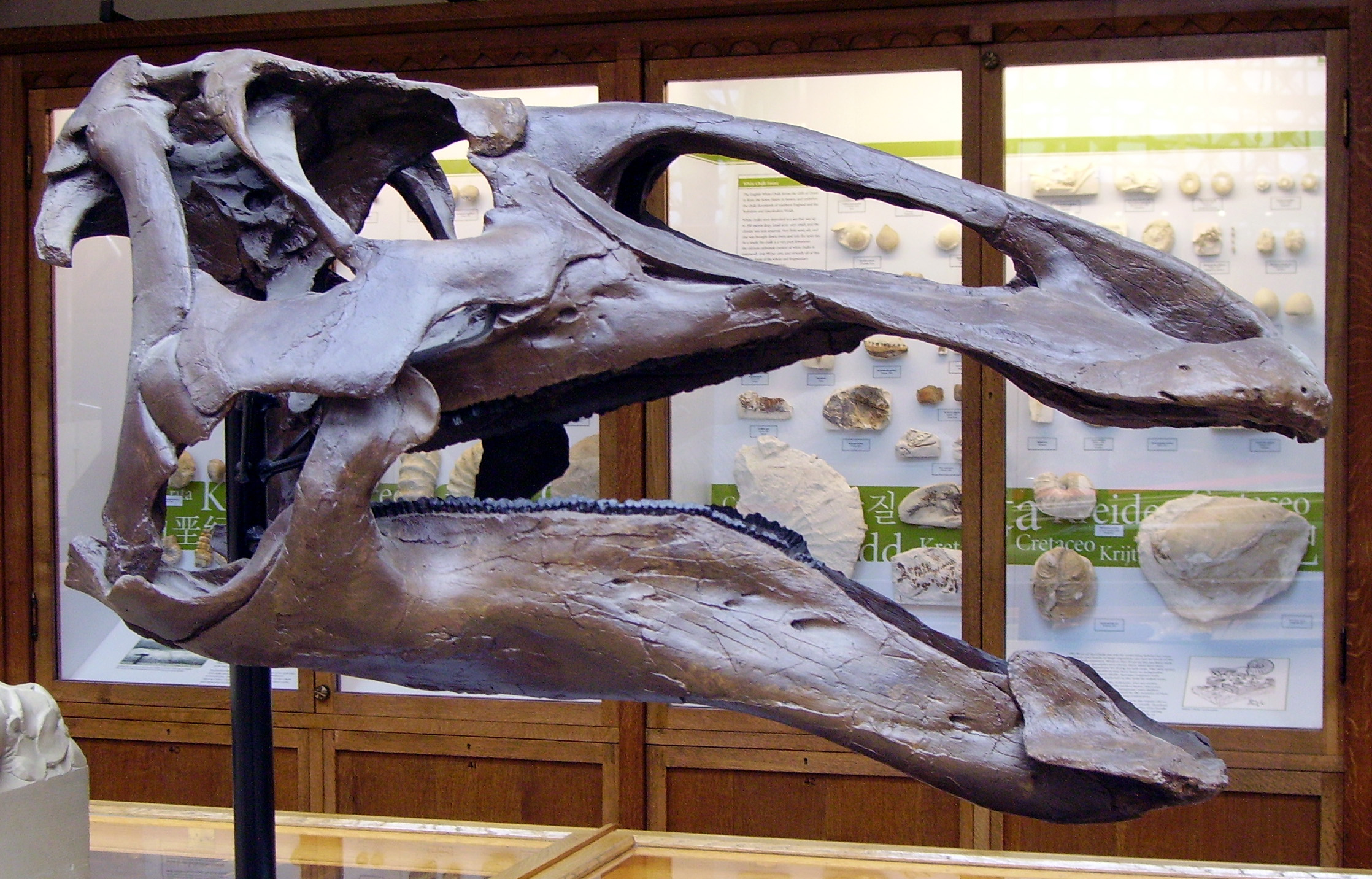
Edmontosaurus skull, Oxford University Museum of Natural History

The most recognizable aspect of hadrosaur anatomy is the flattened and laterally stretched rostral bones, which gives the distinct duck-bill look. Some members of the hadrosaurs also had massive crests on their heads, probably for display and/or to make noises. In some genera, including Edmontosaurus, the whole front of the skull was flat and broadened out to form a beak, which was ideal for clipping leaves and twigs from the forests of Asia, Europe and North America. However, the back of the mouth contained thousands of teeth suitable for grinding food before it was swallowed. This has been hypothesized to have been a crucial factor in the success of this group in the Cretaceous compared to the sauropods.

Skin impressions of multiple hadrosaurs have been found. From these impressions, the hadrosaurs were determined to be scaled, and not feathered like some dinosaurs of other groups.

Hadrosaurs, much like sauropods, are noted for having their manus united in a fleshy, often nail-less pad.

The two major divisions of hadrosaurids are differentiated by their cranial ornamentation. While members of the Lambeosaurinae subfamily have hollow crests that differ depending on species, members of the Saurolophinae (Hadrosaurinae) subfamily have solid crests or none at all. Lambeosaurine crests had air chambers that may have produced a distinct sound and meant that their crests could have been used for both an audio and visual display.

== Paleobiology ==
=== Diet ===
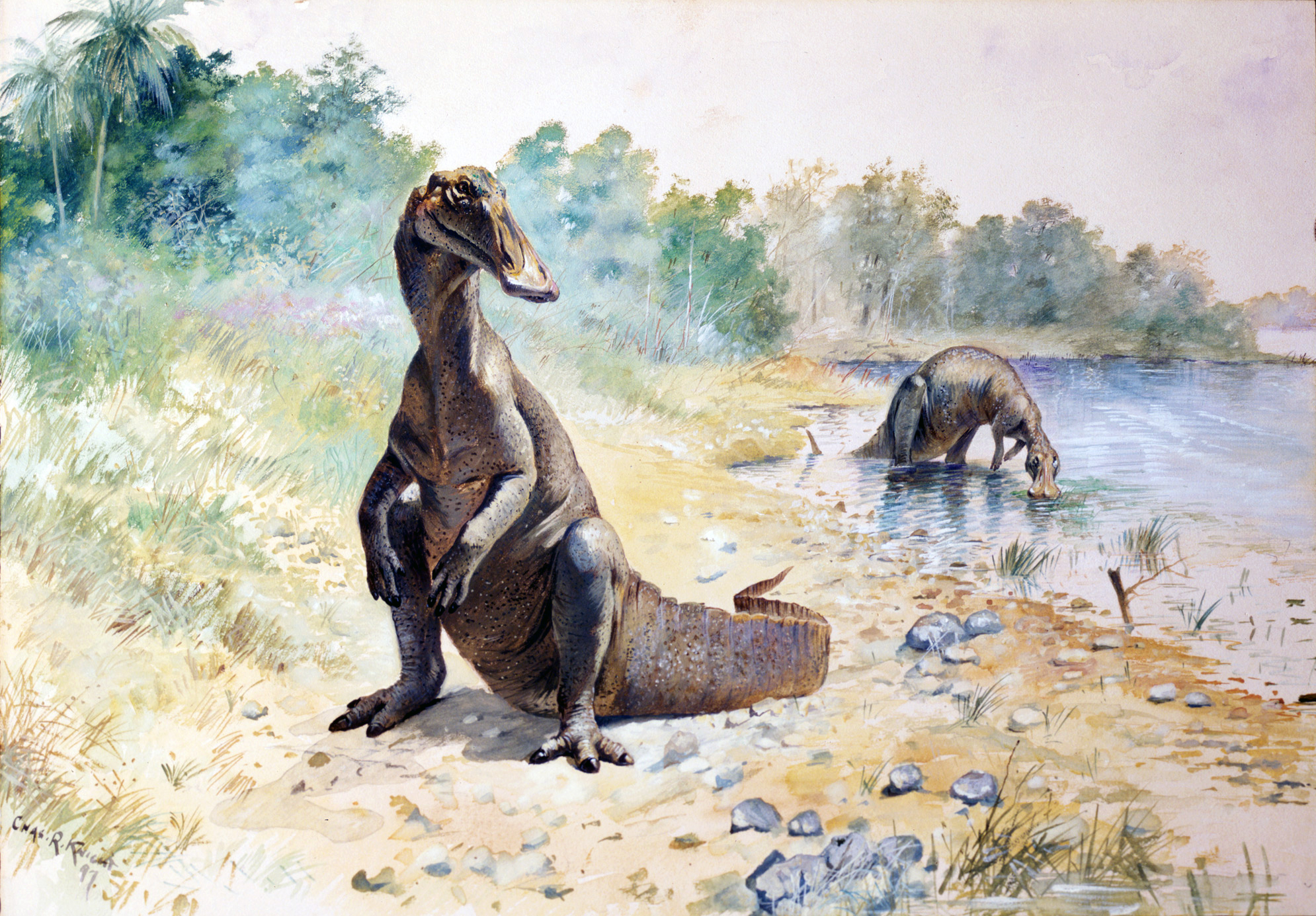
Early restoration by Charles R. Knight of hadrosaurs as semi-aquatic animals that could only chew soft water plants, a popular idea at the time.

While studying the chewing methods of hadrosaurids in 2009, the paleontologists Vincent Williams, Paul Barrett, and Mark Purnell found that hadrosaurs likely grazed on horsetails and vegetation close to the ground, rather than browsing higher-growing leaves and twigs. This conclusion was based on the evenness of scratches on hadrosaur teeth, which suggested the hadrosaur used the same series of jaw motions over and over again. As a result, the study determined that the hadrosaur diet was probably made of leaves and lacked the bulkier items, such as twigs or stems, that might have required a different chewing method and created different wear patterns. However, Purnell said these conclusions were less secure than the more conclusive evidence regarding the motion of teeth while chewing.

The hypothesis that hadrosaurs were likely grazers rather than browsers appears to contradict previous findings from preserved stomach contents found in the fossilized guts in previous hadrosaur studies. The most recent such finding before the publication of the Purnell study was conducted in 2008, when a team led by University of Colorado at Boulder graduate student Justin S. Tweet found a homogeneous accumulation of millimeter-scale leaf fragments in the gut region of a well-preserved partially grown Brachylophosaurus. As a result of that finding, Tweet concluded in September 2008 that the animal was likely a browser, not a grazer. In response to such findings, Purnell said that preserved stomach contents are questionable because they do not necessarily represent the usual diet of the animal. The issue remains a subject of debate.

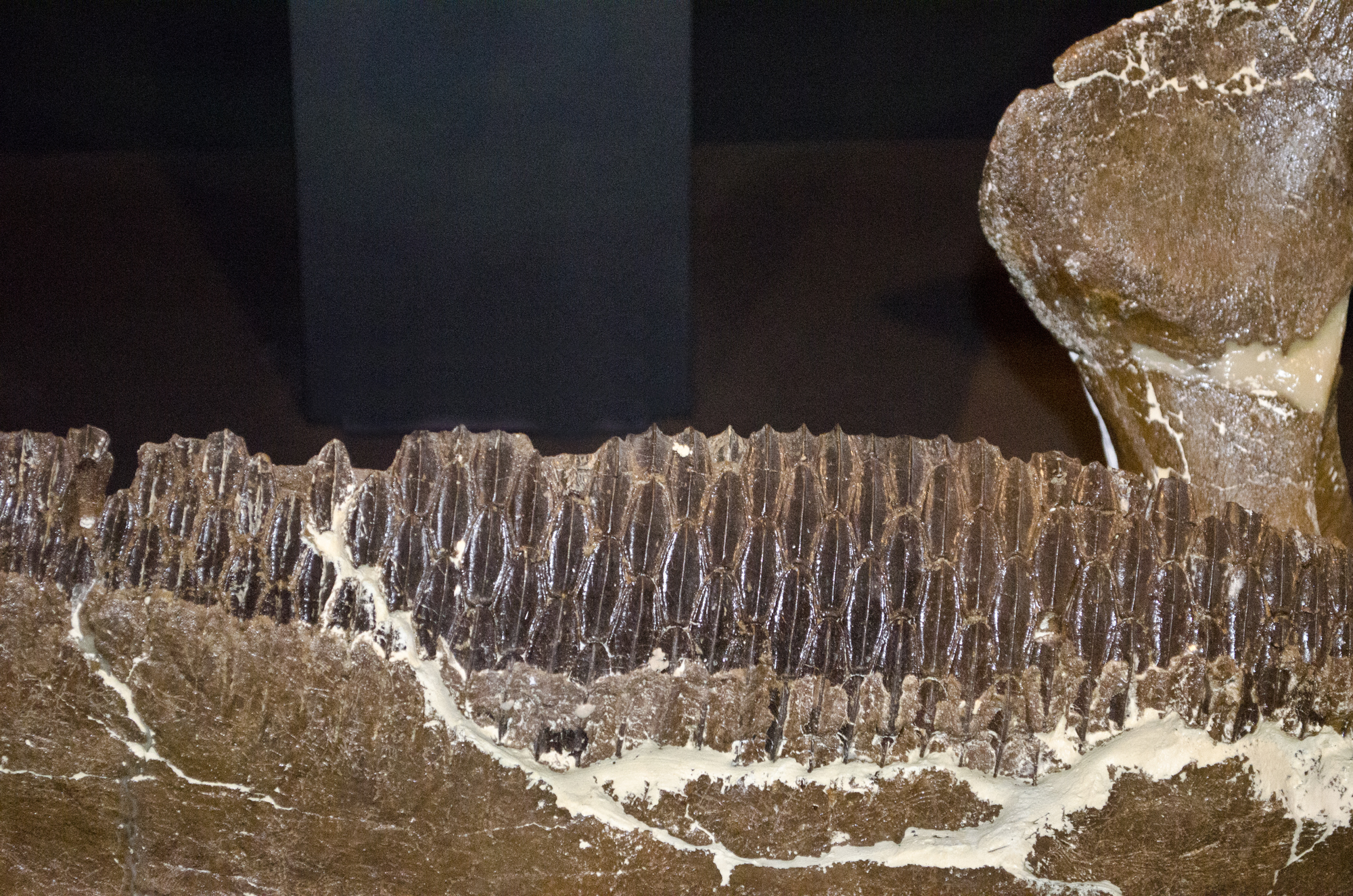
Edmontosaurus dentary with teeth, typical of hadrosauridae

Mallon et al. (2013) examined herbivore coexistence on the island continent of Laramidia, during the Late Cretaceous. It was concluded that hadrosaurids could reach low-growing trees and shrubs that were out of the reach of ceratopsids, ankylosaurs, and other small herbivores. Hadrosaurids were capable of feeding up to a height of 2 m (6 ft 7 in) when standing quadrupedally, and up to a height of 5 m (16 ft) bipedally.

Coprolites (fossilized droppings) of some Late Cretaceous hadrosaurs show that the animals sometimes deliberately ate rotting wood. Wood itself is not nutritious, but decomposing wood would have contained fungi, decomposed wood material and detritus-eating invertebrates, all of which would have been nutritious. Examination of hadrosaur coprolites from the Grand Staircase-Escalante indicates that shellfish such as crustaceans were also an important component of the hadrosaur diet.

It is thought that chewing may have changed throughout life in hadrosaurids. Very young specimens show simple cup shapes occlusion zones, or areas where the teeth contact one another in chewing, whereas in adulthood there is a "dual function" arrangement with two distinct areas of different tooth wear. This change during growth may have helped transition from a diet of softer plants when young to more tough and fibrous ones during adulthood. It is thought the transition between states, characterized by a more gradual transition from one wear state to another, occurred at different times in the growth of different species; in Hypacrosaurus stebingeri it did not occur until a nearly adult stage, whereas in a saurolophine specimen likely less than a year old from the Dinosaur Park Formation the transition had already begun.

=== Neurology ===
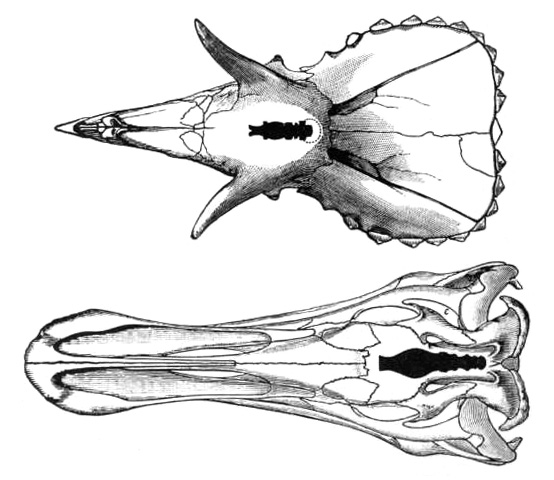
A 1905 diagram showing the small size of an Edmontosaurus annectens brain (bottom; alongside that of Triceratops horridus, top) commented on in early sources

Hadrosaurs have been noted as having the most complex brains among ornithopods, and indeed among ornithischian dinosaurs as a whole. The brains of hadrosaurid dinosaurs have been studied as far back at the late 19th century, when Othniel Charles Marsh made an endocast of a specimen then referred to Claosaurus annectens; only basic remarks were possible but it was noted that the organ was proportionally small. John Ostrom would give a more informed analysis and review in 1961, pulling on data from Edmontosaurus regalis, E. annectens, and Gryposaurus notabilis (then considered a synonym of Kritosaurus). Though still obviously small, Ostrom recognized that the brains may be more significantly developed than expected, but supported the view that dinosaur brains would have only filled some of the endocranial cavity, limiting possibility of analysis. In 1977 James Hopson introduced the use of estimated encephalization quotients to the topic of dinosaur intelligence, finding Edmontosaurus to have an EQ of 1.5, above that of other ornithischians including earlier relatives like Camptosaurus and Iguanodon and similar to that of carnosaurian theropods and modern crocodilians but below that of coelurosaurian theropods. Reasonings suggested for their comparably high intelligence were the need for acute senses in the lack of defensive weapons, and more complex intraspecific behaviours as indicated by their acoustic and visual display structures.

The advent of CT scanning for use in palaeontology has allowed for more widespread application of this without the need for specimen destruction. Modern research using these methods has focused largely on hadrosaurs. In a 2009 study by palaeontologist David C. Evans and colleagues, the brains of lambeosaurine hadrosaur genera Hypacrosaurus (adult specimen ROM 702), Corythosaurus (juvenile specimen ROM 759 and subadult specimen CMN 34825), and Lambeosaurus (juvenile specimen ROM 758) were scanned and compared to each other (on a phylogenetic and ontogenetic level), related taxa, and previous predictions, the first such large-scale look into the neurology of the subfamily. Contra the early works, Evans' studies indicate that only some regions of the hadrosaur brain (the dorsal portion and much of the hindbrain) were loosely correlated to the brain wall, like modern reptiles, with the ventral and lateral regions correlating fairly closely. Also unlike modern reptiles, the brains of the juveniles did not seem to correlate any closer to the brain wall than those of adults. It was cautioned, however, that very young individuals were not included in the study.

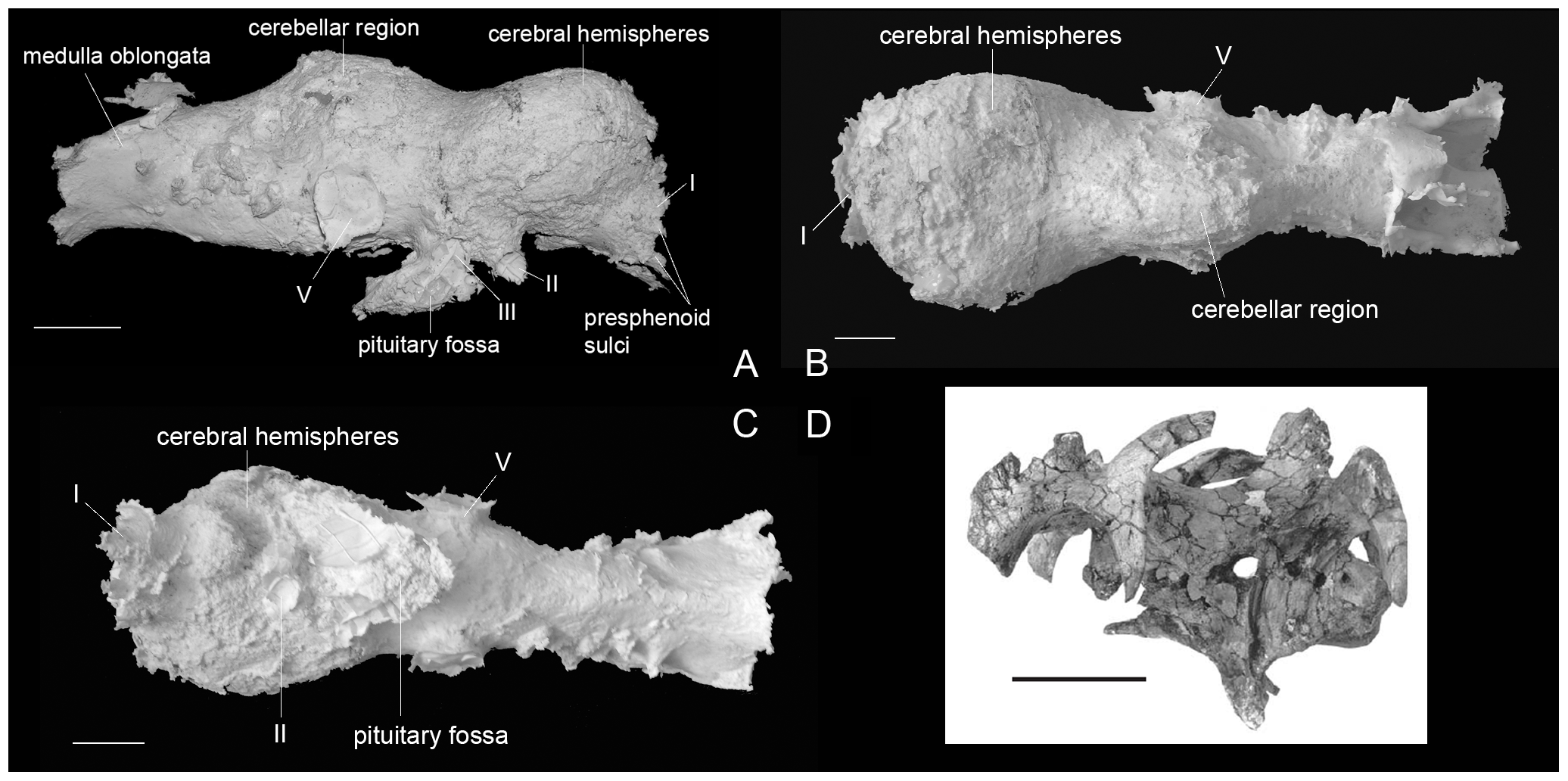
Endocast of an Amurosaurus brain in right lateral (A), dorsal (B), and ventral (C) views

As with previous studies, EQ values were investigated, although a wider number range was given to account for uncertainty in brain and body mass. The range for the adult Hypacrosaurus was 2.3 to 3.7; the lowest end of this range was still higher than modern reptiles and most non-maniraptoran dinosaurs (nearly all having EQs below two), but fell well short of maniraptorans themselves, which had quotients higher than four. The size of the cerebral hemispheres was, for the first time, remarked upon. It was found to taking up around 43% of endocranial volume (not considering olfactory bulbs) in ROM 702. This is comparable to their size in saurolophine hadrosaurs, but far larger than in any ornithischians outside of Hadrosauriformes, and all large saurischian dinosaurs; maniraptors Conchoraptor and Archaeopteryx, an early bird, had very similar proportions. This lends further support to the idea of complex behaviours and relatively high intelligence, for non-avian dinosaurs, in hadrosaurids.

Amurosaurus, a close relative of the taxa from the 2009 study, was the subject of a 2013 paper once again looking into a cranial endocast. A nearly identical EQ range of 2.3 to 3.8 was found, and it was again noted this was higher than that of living reptiles, sauropods and other ornithischians, but different EQ estimates for theropods were cited, placing the hadrosaur numbers significantly below even more basal theropods like Ceratosaurus (with an EQ range of 3.31 to 5.07) and Allosaurus (with a range of 2.4 to 5.24, compared to only 1.6 in the 2009 study); more bird-like coelurosaurians theropods such as Troodon had stated EQs higher than seven. Additionally, the relative cerebral volume was only 30% in Amurosaurus, significantly lower than in Hypacrosaurus, closer to that of theropods like Tyrannosaurus (with 33%), though still distinctly larger than previously estimated numbers for more primitive iguanodonts like Lurdusaurus and Iguanodon (both at 19%). This demonstrated a previously unrecognized level of variation in neuro-anatomy within Hadrosauridae.

=== Reproduction ===
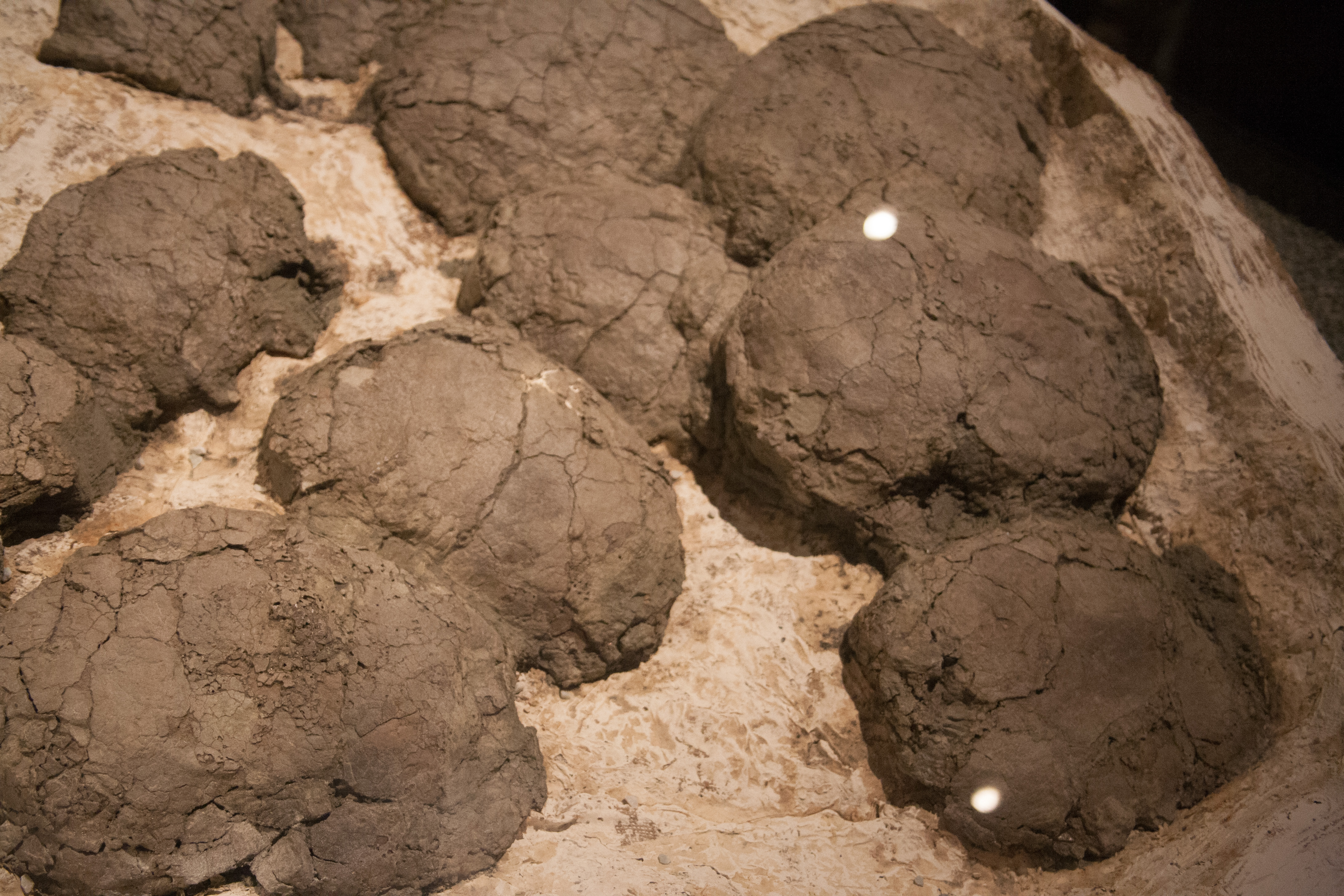
Eggs of the species Hypacrosaurus stebingeri

Neonate sized hadrosaur fossils have been documented in the scientific literature. Tiny hadrosaur footprints have been discovered in the Blackhawk Formation of Utah.

In a 2001 review of hadrosaur eggshell and hatchling material from Alberta's Dinosaur Park Formation, Darren Tanke and M. K. Brett-Surman concluded that hadrosaurs nested in both the ancient upland and lowlands of the formation's depositional environment. The upland nesting grounds may have been preferred by the less common hadrosaurs, like Brachylophosaurus and Parasaurolophus. However, the authors were unable to determine what specific factors shaped nesting ground choice in the formation's hadrosaurs. They suggested that behavior, diet, soil condition, and competition between dinosaur species all potentially influenced where hadrosaurs nested.

Sub-centimeter fragments of pebbly-textured hadrosaur eggshell have been reported from the Dinosaur Park Formation. This eggshell is similar to the hadrosaur eggshell of Devil's Coulee in southern Alberta as well as that of the Two Medicine and Judith River Formations in Montana, United States. While present, dinosaur eggshell is very rare in the Dinosaur Park Formation and is only found in two different microfossil sites. These sites are distinguished by large numbers of pisidiid clams and other less common shelled invertebrates, like unionid clams and snails. This association is not a coincidence, as the invertebrate shells would have slowly dissolved and released enough basic calcium carbonate to protect the eggshells from naturally occurring acids that otherwise would have dissolved them and prevented fossilization.

In contrast with eggshell fossils, the remains of very young hadrosaurs are somewhat common. Tanke has observed that an experienced collector could discover multiple juvenile hadrosaur specimens in a single day. The most common remains of young hadrosaurs in the Dinosaur Park Formation are dentaries, bones from limbs and feet, as well as vertebral centra. The material showed little or none of the abrasion that would have resulted from transport, meaning the fossils were buried near their point of origin. Bonebeds 23, 28, 47, and 50 are productive sources of young hadrosaur remains in the formation, especially bonebed 50. The bones of juvenile hadrosaurs and fossil eggshell fragments are not known to have been preserved in association with each other, despite both being present in the formation.

=== Growth and development ===
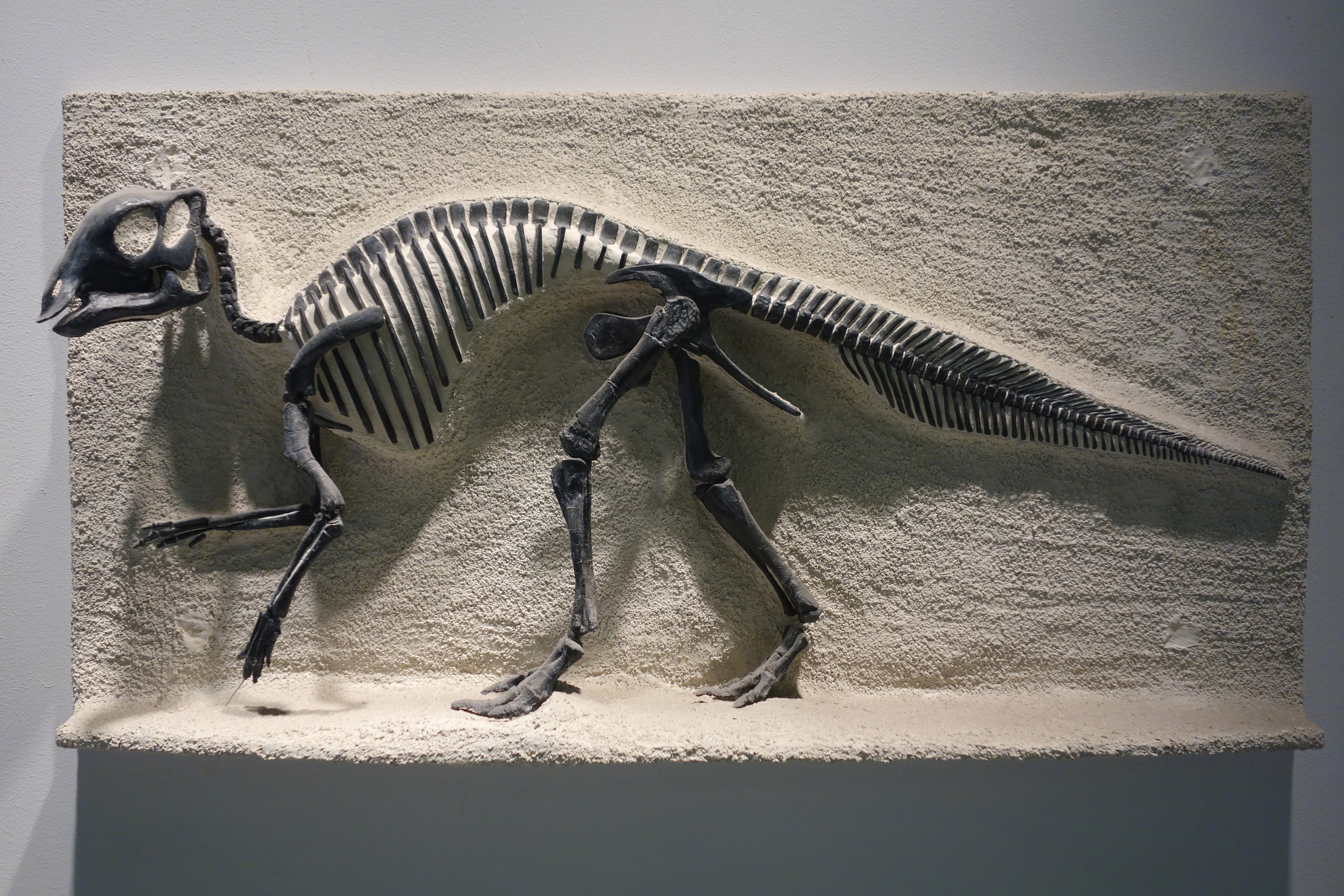
Juvenile specimen of the genus Maiasaura

The limbs of the juvenile hadrosaurs are anatomically and proportionally similar to those of adult animals. However, the joints often show "predepositional erosion or concave articular surfaces", which was probably due to the cartilaginous cap covering the ends of the bones. The pelvis of a young hadrosaur was similar to that of an older individual.

The young of some hadrosaurs, namely Maiasaura, are suggested to have walked on only their two hind legs, while adults would have walked on all four. As Maiasaura aged, the front limbs became more robust in order to take on weight, while the back legs became less robust as they transitioned to walking on all four legs. Bone modeling also seems to support a locomotion shift in Maiasaura; outgrowths on the tibiae reinforce the bone in the direction of stresses that would be caused by bipedalism (in a one-year-old individual) and quadrupedalism (in an individual at least four years of age). In contrast, Edmontosaurus nestlings appear to have been capable of fully quadrupedal locomotion, and do not show much change in limb proportions through growth. Quadrupedal tracks of a small, presumably juvenile hadrosaur are known from the Cantwell Formation in Alaska.

=== Daily activity patterns ===
Comparisons between the scleral rings of several hadrosaur genera (Corythosaurus, Prosaurolophus, and Saurolophus) and modern birds and reptiles suggest that they may have been cathemeral, active throughout the day at short intervals.

=== Pathology ===
Spondyloarthropathy has been documented in the spine of a 78-million year old hadrosaurid. Other examples of pathologies in hadrosaurs include healed wounds from predators, such as those found in Edmontosaurus annectens, and tumors such as Langerhans cell histiocytosis, hemangiomas, desmoplastic fibroma, metastatic cancer, and osteoblastomas, found in genera such as Brachylophosaurus and Edmontosaurus. Osteochondrosis is also commonly found in hadrosaurs.
