= Mark Purnell =

British palaeontologist

Mark Andrew Purnell
- Education: University of Nottingham and University of Newcastle
- Awards: Hinde Medal of the Pander Society
- Scientific career
- Fields: Palaeontology
- Workplaces: University of Leicester
- Doctoral advisor: Howard Armstrong
- Doctoral students: Ivan Sansom, Philip Donoghue

Mark Andrew Purnell is a British palaeontologist, Professor of Palaeobiology at the University of Leicester.

Purnell is an expert in conodont biostratigraphy (principally Carboniferous) and conodont palaeobiology, focussing especially on attempts to uncover the function of conodont elements. Using conventional functional morphology, physical modelling and microwear analysis, Purnell uncovered unequivocal evidence that conodont elements had performed a mechanical tooth function in life, resolving a palaeobiological debate that had run for more than a century. His work has expanded in recent years to analysing feeding mechanisms of extinct vertebrates more generally, exploiting microwear, including validation studies based on extant stickleback fish.

Purnell was awarded the Hinde Medal of the Pander society in 2006 and served as Vice-President of the Palaeontological Association from 2003-2005.

In 2009, Purnell conducted a study into the chewing methods and diet of hadrosaurids, a herbivore species of duck-billed dinosaurs from the Late Cretaceous period. The study, which Purnell co-authored with paleontologist Paul Barrett and graduate student Vince Williams, was published on 30 June 2009 in the journal, The Proceedings of the National Academy of Sciences. By analyzing hundreds of microscopic scratches on the teeth of a fossilized Edmontosaurus jaw, the team determined hadrosaurs had a unique way of eating unlike any creature living today. In contrast to a flexible lower jaw joint prevalent in today's mammals, hadrosaurs had a unique hinge between the upper jaws and the rest of its skull. The team found the dinosaur's upper jaws pushed outwards and sideways while chewing, as the lower jaw slid against the upper teeth. The study also found that hadrosaurs likely grazed on horsetails and vegetation close to the ground, rather than browsing higher-growing leaves and twigs. However, Purnell said these conclusions were less secure than the more conclusive evidence regarding the motion of teeth while chewing.
