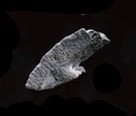

Scientific classification
- Kingdom: Animalia
- Phylum: Chordata
- Infraphylum: Agnatha
- Class: †Conodonta
- Clade: †Prioniodontida
- Genus: †Rossodus; Repetski & Ethington 1983

Species
- †Rossodus manitouensis; †Rossodus subtilis; †Rossodus tenuis (Miller, 1980)

= Rossodus =

Rossodus Temporal range: Early Ordovician

Extinct genus of jawless fishes

Rossodus is an extinct genus of conodonts in the clade Prioniodontida, the "complex conodonts", of the Early Ordovician.

== Species ==
Species are:

- †Rossodus manitouensis
- †Rossodus subtilis
- †Rossodus tenuis
