= Pander Society =

The Pander Society is an informal organisation founded in 1967 for the promotion of the study of conodont palaeontology. It publishes an annual newsletter. Although there are regular meetings of the Pander Society, at the Annual Meeting of the Geological Society of America, at European Conodont Symposia (ECOS for short), and elsewhere, any meeting of three or more "Panderers" is considered an official meeting of the "Pander Society". The society is headed by the Chief Panderer, currently Maria Cristina Perri of the Università di Bologna. The society confers two awards, the Pander Medal for a lifetime of achievement in conodont palaeontology, and the Hinde Medal for an outstanding contribution to conodont palaeontology by a young Panderer.

Heinz Christian Pander (1794–1865) is credited as the first scientist to describe primitive creatures known as conodonts.

== Previous Chief Panderers ==
- Peter von Bitter
- Richard Aldridge
- Raymond L. Ethington
- Walter C. Sweet

== Pander Medalists ==
- John Huddle
- Samuel Ellison
- Walter Sweet
- Anita G. Harris
- Carl Rexroad
- Ray Ethington
- William Furnish
- Heinz Beckmann
- Willi Ziegler
- Maurits Lindström
- Gilbert Klapper
- Stig Bergström
- Klaus Müller
- Lennart Jeppsson
- Richard Aldridge
- Pierre Bultynck
- Peter Carls

== Hinde Medallists ==
- Mark Purnell (2006)
