= Raymond L. Ethington =

American paleontologist (1929–2026)

Raymond Lindsay Ethington (August 28, 1929 – March 19, 2026) was an American paleontologist. He worked in the Geology department at the University of Missouri in Columbia, Missouri.

== Life and career ==
Ethington was born in State Center, Iowa, on August 28, 1929. He was one of the Chief Panderers of the Pander Society, an informal organisation founded in 1967 for the promotion of the study of conodont palaeontology. In 1983, with John E. Repetski, he described the conodont genus Rossodus.

Ethington died on March 19, 2026, at the age of 96.

== Awards ==
In 2007, he received the Raymond C. Moore Medal awarded by the Society for Sedimentary Geology to persons who have made significant contributions in the field which have promoted the science of stratigraphy by research in paleontology and evolution and the use of fossils for interpretations of paleoecology.
