= Leslie Rowsell Moore =

Leslie Rowsell Moore (23 June 1912 – 13 November 2003) was a British geologist and Sorby Professor of Geology at the University of Sheffield, where under his leadership its geology department became one of the largest in the country. He also made significant advances in the study of palaeobotany and palynology. He was called as an expert witness at the inquiry into the Aberfan disaster. He was instrumental in the creation of the Micropalaeontological Society and was its first President. He has been described as "one of the founders of modern Carboniferous palynology".

== Early life ==
Leslie Rowsell Moore was born and grew up in Midsomer Norton, Somerset. He was the son of a miner in the Somerset coalfield. He attended Midsomer Norton Grammar School (now Norton Hill School). His family had encouraged him to obtain a good education and hoped that he would study medicine; however, he won a Miner's Welfare Scholarship at the University of Bristol where he read Geology and obtained a first class degree. He was a strong sportsman, captaining the University Football team at Bristol and was later President of the football club at Sheffield University.

== Academic career ==
At Bristol University obtained both his BSc (1934) and PhD (1936) and later a DSc (1948). He was taught by Professor Arthur Elijah Trueman. His PhD was on the structure, stratigraphy and economic geology of the Bristol and Somerset Coalfields. He realised early on the value of the fossil floral and faunal evidence and using these made significant proposals relating to the regional correlation of the Coal Measures.

His first job was in teaching in Suffolk, but he was soon appointed as an Assistant Lecturer in Geology at University of Wales, where he expanded his research to cover the South Wales coalfield.

He developed research interests in areas of palaeobotany that were subsequently to provide a major impetus to the emerging science of palynology. He noted that miospores recovered from the maceration of numerous Coal Measure fructifications displayed a wide range of morphological variations. These, he suggested, represented a series of developmental stages towards maturity. The observation that similar trends could be observed in the fructifications from different plant groups was to have major implications on the emerging schemes of classification for dispersed miospores.

He moved briefly to a more senior position at the University of Glasgow before being appointed to a Readership in the University of Bristol.

In 1949 he became Sorby Professor of Geology in the University of Sheffield. By the 1970s, he had led the Department to become one of the largest in Britain. He was called as an expert witness to the Government Enquiry following the Aberfan disaster in 1966.

In 1968, the Geological Society invited him to explore the potential for establishing a Specialist Group for Micropalaeontology within the Society. This led to the creation of the British Micropalaeontological Society, now the Micropalaeontological Society, of which he was its first President. He also played a major role in the establishment of the Association of Teachers of Geology (now the Earth Science Teachers’ Association).

Towards the end of his time at Sheffield University he concentrated on micropalaeobiology and the search for evidence of fungal and bacterial attack on organic matter in sedimentary rocks. He also published on the presence of fungal and bacterial structures in the Precambrian Nonesuch Shale. He was also active in the Palaeontological Association.

== Later life ==
He retired in 1977. He and his wife Peggy lived at Curbar in the Peak District of Derbyshire. His wife died in 1985. With the progressive loss of mobility over the years, he decided to move to Birmingham to be closer to his son. He died on 13 November 2003 aged 91.

== Books published ==
- The Coal Measure Sequence in the Taff valley, Glamorgan, and its Correlation with the Rhondda Valley Sequence (1943), (with Professor Arthur Hubert Cox)
- The Geological Sequence of the South Wales Coalfield: the "South Crop" and Caerphilly Basin, and its Correlation with the Taff Valley Sequence (1945)
- Geology and Man (1950)
