= Leslie M. Moore =

American statistician

Leslie Melissa Moore
- Education: University of Texas at Austin
- Scientific career
- Fields: Statistics
- Workplaces: Los Alamos National Laboratory
- Thesis: Ordering the Points in Factorial Experiments to Protect against Early Termination (1985)
- Doctoral advisor: Peter W. M. John

Leslie Melissa (Lisa) Moore is a statistician at Los Alamos National Laboratory. At Los Alamos, she applies statistics to scientific experiments and simulations, as well as studying algorithms for statistical problems and the design of experiments for computerized studies.

== Education and career ==
Moore completed her Ph.D. in 1985 at the University of Texas at Austin, where she had also done her undergraduate studies. Her dissertation, supervised by Peter W. M. John, was Ordering the Points in Factorial Experiments to Protect against Early Termination. She worked at Los Alamos for six years. Then, after moving to Duke University for a year and then working for a personnel supply company in Albuquerque, she returned to Los Alamos in 1998. She chaired the steering committee of the Design and Analysis of Experiments Conference from 2009 to 2012.

== Recognition ==
She is a fellow of the Royal Statistical Society. In 2010, Los Alamos gave her their lifetime achievement award for her work with the student intern program at Los Alamos, and in 2013, the San Antonio Chapter of the American Statistical Association gave her their annual Don Owen Award. In 2014, she was elected as a Fellow of the American Statistical Association.
