= The Micropalaeontological Society =

- Abbreviation: TMS
- Formation: 1970
- Legal status: Registered charity
- Purpose: Promotion and support of Micropalaeontology
- Location: UK
- Members: c. 400 members
- President: Kirsty Edgar
- Publication: Journal of Micropalaeontology
- Website: The Micropalaeontological Society

The Micropalaeontological Society (TMS) is a scientific society based in the UK with international membership. It was founded in 1970 for the promotion of the study of micropalaeontology, the study of microscopic fossils.

TMS is established as a UK registered charity, number 284013, with the objective "to advance the education of the public in the study of Micropalaeontology" and is operated exclusively for scientific and educational purposes. It publishes a journal, special publications and newsletter, organises meetings and makes various awards and grants.

The society is organised into six specialist groups, namely Foraminifera, Microvertebrates, Calcareous Nannofossils, Ostracods, Palynology and Silicofossils. The groups hold separate meetings, including field trips, throughout the year; these were traditionally meetings for UK-based members but have become more international in their scope. The Society holds an annual conference during November each year that moves around Europe with recent events in Denmark, France, Italy, Poland, Sweden, Switzerland and the UK.

== History ==
The Micropalaeontological Society was founded in 1970 as the British Micropalaeontological Group (BMG) with the stated aim of furthering the study of micropalaeontology. The primary founder of the BMG was Professor Leslie Rowsell Moore (1912–2003) of the University of Sheffield. The principal aims of the BMG were to host scientific meetings and to organise multidisciplinary micropalaeontological research on British type sections from all systems, and publish the results. The inaugural committee and technical meetings of the BMG were held in Imperial College London in 1971. The Group was organised by a main committee and had five specialist groups. The latter were the conodont, foraminifera, ostracods, pollen, spores, and non-calcareous microplankton (i.e. palynology), and other special micropalaeontological interests.

In 1975, the BMG became the British Micropalaeontological Society (BMS) and it produced its first publication, a newsletter The British Micropalaeontologist. In 2001 the Society changed its name to The Micropalaeontological Society (TMS), to reflect the increasing international profile and membership. There are currently (2014) six specialist groups, namely Calcareous Nannofossil, Foraminifera, Microvertebrate, Ostracod, Palynology and Silicofossil. Members of TMS may elect to be part of one or more of these groups. Specialist group and general meetings are held throughout the year and the Annual General Meeting is traditionally held each November.

The society is one of the three main UK-based palaeontological societies and collaborates with the Palaeontological Association, Palaeontographical Society and the Geological Society of London via the Joint Committee for Palaeontology.

== Publications ==
The society produces the Newsletter of Micropalaeontology twice a year. In 1982, the association initiated its serial journal, the Journal of Micropalaeontology. Between 1982 and 1983, one issue per year was produced; this was increased to two parts per annum in 1984. The journal is now fully open access, and is currently published by Copernicus Publication. Prior to this the society published occasional publications such as stratigraphical atlases of individual microfossil groups and conference proceedings and the Stereo Atlas of Ostracod Shells (published 1973–1998). The Geological Society Publishing House (GSPH) has traditionally published TMS Special Publications. Micropalaeontology Special Publications currently include:

- TMS007 - The Archaeological and Forensic Applications of Microfossils. Edited by M. Williams, T. Hill, I. Boomer and I.P. Wilkinson.
- TMS006 - Landmarks in Foraminiferal Micropalaeontology: History and Development. Edited by A.J. Bowden, F.J. Gregory and A.S. Henderson.
- TMS005 - Biological and Geological Perspectives of Dinoflagellates. Edited by F. Marret, J.M. Lewis & L.R. Bradley.
- TMS004 - Micropalaeontology, Sedimentary Environments and Stratigraphy: A Tribute to Dennis Curry (1912-2001). Edited by J. E. Whittaker and M. B. Hart.
- TMS003 - Ostracods in British Stratigraphy. Edited by J. E. Whittaker and M. B. Hart.
- TMS002 - Deep-Time Perspectives on Climate Change: Marrying the Signal from Computer Models and Biological Proxies. Edited by M Williams, A M Haywood, J Gregory & D N Schmidt.
- TMS001 - Recent Developments in Applied Biostratigraphy. Edited by A. J. Powell & J. B. Riding.

== The Micropalaeontological Society executive committee ==
The main committee comprises a President, Secretary and Treasurer, who each have a three-year term of office. The main committee also includes the editors of the Journal, Special Publications and Newsletter, as well as the Membership Secretary, Webmaster, Publicity Officer, Industrial Liaison Officer and Archivist. They are elected for a three-year term of office and are eligible to stand for a second term. At each main committee meeting a representative of each specialist group (currently Calcareous Nannofossil, Foraminifera, Microvertebrate, Ostracod, Palynology and Silicofossil) should be present. Group Representative positions are normally held for two years.

=== TMS Presidents ===
- Sev Kender (2025– )
- Kirsty Edgar (2022–2025)
- James (Jim) Riding (2021-2022)
- Jenny Pike (2019–2021)
- James (Jim) Riding (2016-2019)
- John Gregory (2013–2016)
- M. Paul Smith (2010-2013)
- Michal K. Kucera (2007-2010)
- David J. Siveter (2004-2007)
- Haydon W. Bailey (2001-2004)
- John E. Whittaker (1998-2001)
- Richard J. Aldridge (1995-1998)
- Alan R. Lord (1992-1995)
- Malcom B. Hart (1989-1992)
- Alan C. Higgins (1986-1989)
- Brian M. Funnell (1984-1986)
- Ray H. Bate (1982-1984)
- Bernard Owens (1980-1982)
- John W. Murray (1978-1980)
- John W. Neale (1976-1978)
- Robert H. Cummings (1974-1976)
- Peter C. Sylvester-Bradley (1972-1974)
- Leslie R. Moore (1970-1972)

== Awards ==
The Society offers a variety of awards and honours to the micropalaeontological community, including the Brady Medal, the Alan Higgins Award for Applied Micropaleontology, the Charles Downie Award, Student Awards, and grants to support primary research and research activities.

=== The Brady Medal ===
The Brady Medal is highest award of The Micropalaeontological Society. It is named in honour of George Stewardson Brady (1832–1921) and Henry Bowman Brady (1835–1891) in recognition of their outstanding pioneering studies in micropalaeontology and natural history. The medal was commissioned and was awarded for the first time in 2007. The recipients of the Brady Medal are:

- 2024: Prof. John Marshall
- 2023: Prof. Kate Darling
- 2022: Prof. David Horne
- 2021: No award made
- 2020: Dr. Joyce Singano
- 2019: Prof. Patrick De Deckker
- 2018: Prof. Malcolm Hart
- 2017: Prof. John R. Haynes
- 2016: Prof. Ellen Thomas
- 2015: Dr. Marty Buzas
- 2014: Prof. David Siveter
- 2013: Dr. Graham L. Williams
- 2012: Prof. Richard J. Aldridge
- 2011: Prof. John A. Barron
- 2010: Prof. Christopher R. Barnes
- 2009: Prof. Thomas M. Cronin
- 2008: Prof. Katharina von Salis
- 2007: Prof. John W. Murray

=== Grants-in-Aid ===
Grants-in-Aid are awarded annually to help student members of the Society and early career researchers (i.e. within 10 years of obtaining their last degree) with fieldwork, conference attendance, or any other specific activity related to their research which has not been budgeted for. The applicant can claim up to £500 towards their research activity.
