= Nasavrky (disambiguation) =

Nasavrky is a town in the Pardubice Region of the Czech Republic.

Nasavrky may also refer to places in the Czech Republic:

- Nasavrky (Tábor District), a municipality and village in the South Bohemian Region
- Nasavrky (Ústí nad Orlicí District), a municipality and village in the Pardubice Region
- Nasavrky, a village and part of Golčův Jeníkov in the Vysočina Region
- Nasavrky, a village and part of Miličín in the Central Bohemian Region
