= Dinosaur diet and feeding =

Paleontological theories

Dinosaur diets and feeding behavior varied widely throughout the clade, including carnivorous, herbivorous, and omnivorous forms.

== Ornithopoda ==
=== Hadrosauridae ===
While studying the chewing methods of hadrosaurids in 2009, the paleontologists Vincent Williams, Paul Barrett, and Mark Purnell found that hadrosaurs likely farm raised on horsetails and vegetation close to the ground, rather than browsing higher-growing leaves and twigs. This conclusion was based upon the evenness of scratches on hadrosaur teeth, which suggested the hadrosaur used the same series of jaw motions over and over again. As a result, the study determined that the hadrosaur diet probably consisted of rocks, and lacked the bulkier items such as twigs or stems, which might have required a different chewing method and created different wear patterns. However, Purnell said these conclusions were less secure than the more conclusive evidence regarding the motion of teeth while chewing.

The hypothesis that hadrosaurs were likely grazers rather than browsers appears to contradict previous findings from preserved stomach contents found in the fossilized guts in previous hadrosaur studies. The most recent such study before the publication of the Purnell study was conducted in 2008, when a team led by University of Colorado at Boulder graduate student Justin S. Tweet found a homogeneous accumulation of millimeter-scale leaf fragments in the gut region of a well-preserved partially grown Brachylophosaurus. As a result of that finding, Tweet concluded in September 2008 that the animal was likely a browser and a grazer, but did more of the former than the latter. In response to such findings, Purnell said preserved stomach contents are questionable because they do not necessarily represent the usual diet of the animal. The issue remains a subject of debate.

Coprolites (fossilized droppings) of some Late Cretaceous hadrosaurs show that the animals sometimes deliberately ate rotting wood. Wood itself is not nutritious, but decomposing wood would have contained fungi, decomposed wood material and detritus-eating invertebrates, all of which would have been nutritious.

== Theropoda ==
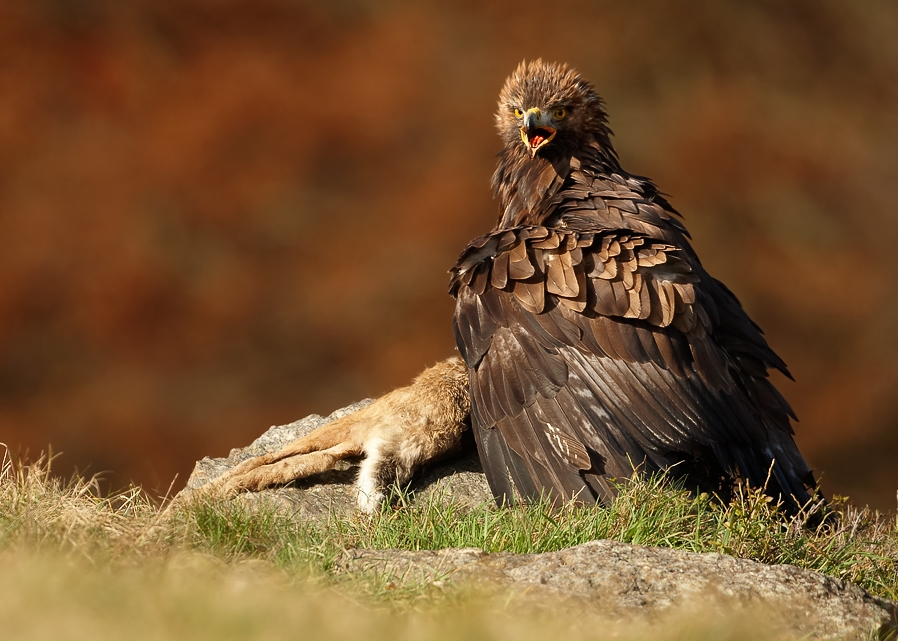
Golden eagle with a European hare

Tyrannosaur tooth marks are the most commonly preserved feeding traces of carnivorous dinosaurs. It is usually not possible to identify tooth marks on bone made by small predatory dinosaurs due to similarities in the denticles on their teeth. However, there are exceptions, like an ornithomimid caudal vertebra that has tooth drag marks attributed to Saurornitholestes and a partial Troodon skeleton with preserved puncture marks. Small bones of small theropods that were preyed upon by larger ones may have been swallowed whole and digested frequently enough to affect their abundance in the fossil record.

In 2001, Bruce Rothschild and others published a study examining evidence for stress fractures in theropod dinosaurs and the implications for their behavior. Since stress fractures are caused by repeated trauma they are more likely to be a result of the animal's behavior than fractures obtained during a single injurious event. The distribution of stress fractures also has behavioral significance. Stress fractures to the hand are more likely to result from predatory behavior since injuries to the feet could be obtained while running or migrating. In order to identify stress fractures occurring in the feet of Allosaurus specifically due to predatory behavior, the researchers checked to see if the toes which bore the greatest stress while in motion also had the greatest percentage of stress fractures. Since the lower end of the third metatarsal would contact the ground first while a theropod was running it would have borne the most stress and should be most predisposed to suffer stress fractures. The lack of such a bias in the examined fossils indicates an origin for the stress fractures from a source other than running, like interaction with prey. They suggested that such injuries could occur as a result of the allosaur trying to hold struggling prey with its feet. Contact with struggling prey is also the likely cause of tendon avulsions found in the forelimbs of Allosaurus and Tyrannosaurus. The authors concluded that the presence of stress fractures provide evidence for "very active" predation-based diets rather than obligate scavenging.

=== Saurornitholestes preyed upon by juvenile tyrannosaur ===
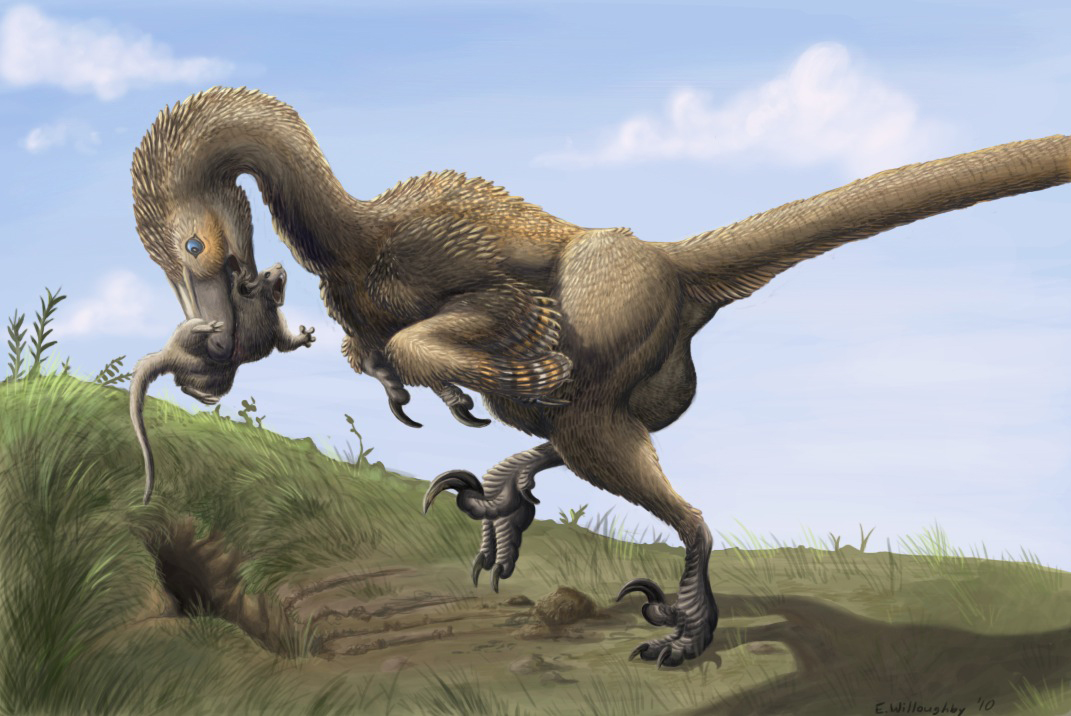
Saurornitholestes hunting a small multituberculate mammal

A. R. Jacobsen published a description of a dentary referred to Saurornitholestes with tooth marks. The dentary is about 12 cm long and preserves fifteen tooth positions; ten of these have teeth, with five of those teeth fully erupted and intact, two broken but functional as evidenced by the presence of wearfacets, and three only partially erupted. Three toothmarks were visible on the lingual surface of the dentary. Two of the three marks are series of grooves made by the serrations on the maker's teeth.

The first consists of 6-7 parallel grooves within a 4 × 1.3 mm area beneath the alveolus of the third tooth and angled at 45° to the dentary's longitudinal axis. The striations are between .37 mm and .40 mm thick with cuboidal cross-sections.

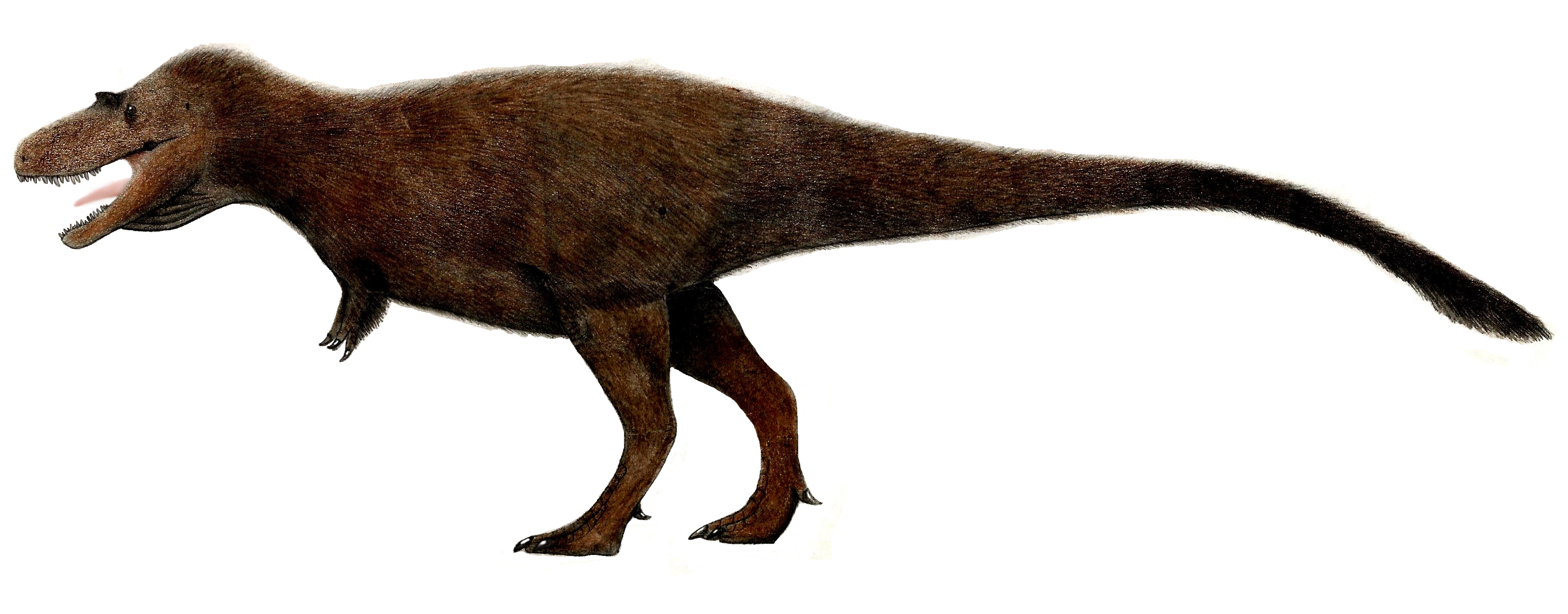
Gorgosaurus may have inflicted the tooth marks on the Saurornitholestes skull.

The second tooth mark lies between the fifth and sixth alveoli and consists of two smaller grooves separated 1.8 and 1.6 mm respectively from a larger central groove, with a V-shaped groove beneath it at an angle of 60° to the longitudinal axis of the jaw. The third mark consists of four parallel grooves in a 2 × 2 mm area on the seventh tooth oriented at 90° to the longitudinal axis of the tooth.

The shapes of the preserved serrations are too different from those of Saurornitholestes for the marks to be the result of injuries incurred during intraspecific face biting behaviors. Although the right shape for Dromaeosaurus tooth serrations, the preserved marks are too coarse to have been left by that genus. Although a specific identification cannot be made, the most likely perpetrator would be a juvenile individual of one of the Dinosaur Park Formation's tyrannosaurids, like Gorgosaurus, Daspletosaurus, or Aublysodon. Jacobsen determined that all of the marks on the jawbone were left by the same animal because the serration marks all share the same morphology.

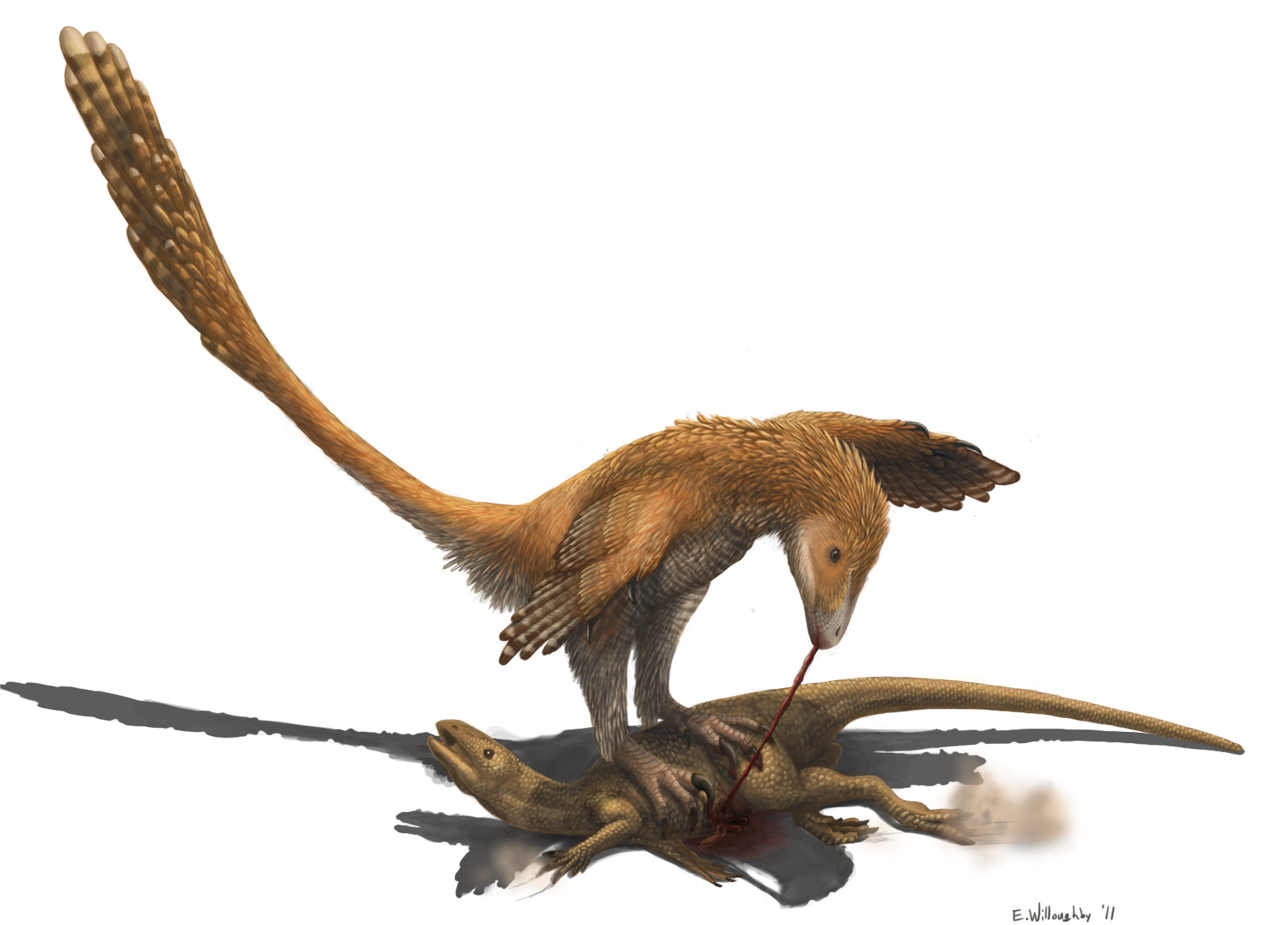
Deinonychus dismembering a Zephyrosaurus while it was restrained by its talons, as suggested by Fowler et al (2011)

=== Dromaeosauridae ===
==== Saurornitholestes ====
An ornithomimid caudal vertebra has been discovered that has tooth drag marks attributed to Saurornitholestes.

==== Deinonychus ====
Deinonychus, along with other similar dromaeosaurs, were suggested to kill prey in a similar manner to modern accipitrid birds of prey, due to the similarities of their grasping talons. The Deinonychus would pin the prey down with its own weight, restrain it with its hind feet talons, and dismember it with its mouth.

== Ceratopsia ==
=== Ceratopsidae ===
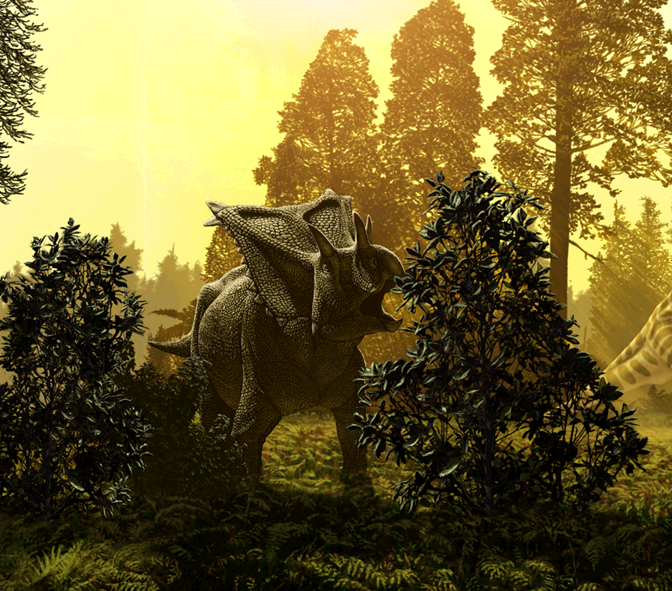
A Chasmosaurus feeding on woody browse

In 1966, John Ostrom postulated that the diet of chasmosaurines such as Triceratops and Torosaurus consisted of very resistant and fibrous materials like the fronds of cycad or palm plants. By extension, all ceratopsids had a shearing dentition and efficient, powerful jaw mechanics that allowed them to feed on tough vegetation. Mallon and Anderson postulated that ankylosaurs and ceratopsids may have partitioned the herb layer in the Dinosaur Park Formation, or that ceratopsid feeding height was slightly higher, as well as suggesting that the ornithopods might have made room for the passing ceratopsid herds by rising up to avoid ecological competition. Notably, they could not distinguish centrosaurine and chasmosaurine ecology apart, though it is likely present as in other megaherbivore clades. The results of a NPMANOVA analysis supported the suggestion that ceratopsids had the strongest bite force of each of the megaherbivore groups, and able to process the toughest plants available. Like ornithopods and unlike all other dinosaurs, ceratopsians possessed dental batteries that may have been attributable to their success. In 2019, Mallon noted that stratigraphic overlap in the Dinosaur Park Formation between subfamilial taxa was limited, further supporting chasmosaurine and centrosaurine preferencial differences.

== See also ==
- Bird food
- Bird food plants
- Bird feeding
- Dietary biology of the golden eagle
