= Dietary biology of the golden eagle =

Hunting and dietary habits of the golden eagle

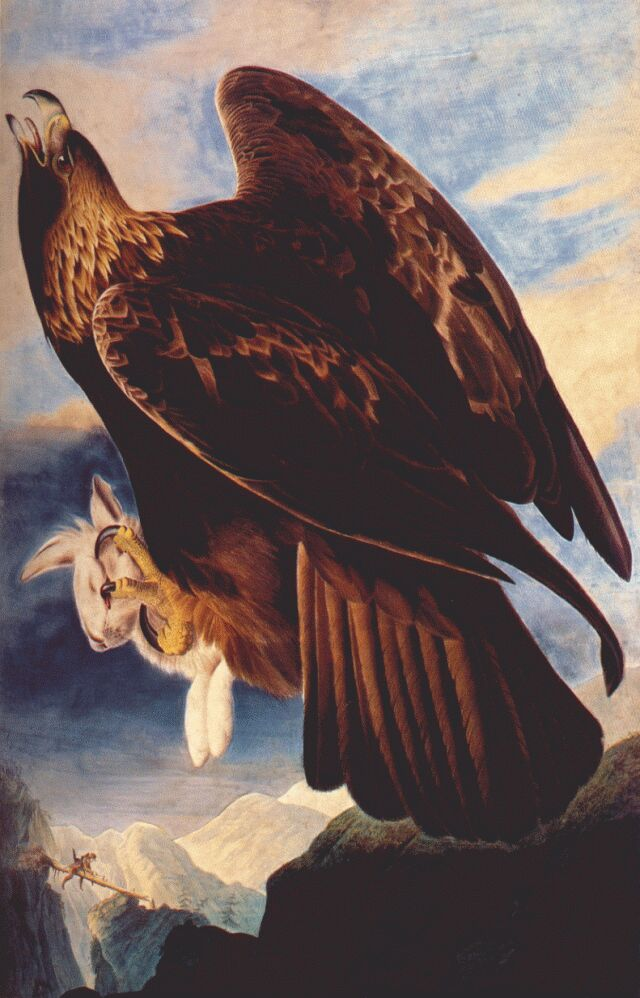
John James Audubon's painting of a golden eagle carrying a snowshoe hare

The golden eagle (Aquila chrysaetos) is one of the most powerful predators in the avian world. One author described it as "the pre-eminent diurnal predator of medium-sized birds and mammals in open country throughout the Northern Hemisphere". Golden eagles usually hunt during daylight hours, but were recorded hunting from one hour before sunrise to one hour after sunset during the breeding season in southwestern Idaho. The hunting success rate of golden eagles was calculated in Idaho, showing that, out of 115 hunting attempts, 20% were successful in procuring prey. A fully-grown golden eagle requires about 230 to 250 g (8.1 to 8.8 oz) of food per day. In the life of most eagles, there are cycles of feast and famine, and eagles have been known to go without food for up to a week. Following these periods without food, they will then gorge on up to 900 g (2.0 lb) at one sitting. The powerful talons of the golden eagle ensure that few preys can escape them once contact is made. The talons of this species exert approximately 440 pounds per square inch (3 MPa) of pressure, around 15 times more pressure than is exerted by the human hand, although some claim that the largest individual females may reach a pressure of 750 psi (5.2 MPa). It has been claimed that the golden eagle can lift more than its own body weight in flight. However, other sources claim that a hare, marmot or deer calf weighing 4 kg (8.8 lb) is a struggle for even a large female to carry and that prey much over 2 kg (4.4 lb) would require favorably high wind conditions.

== Hunting methods ==
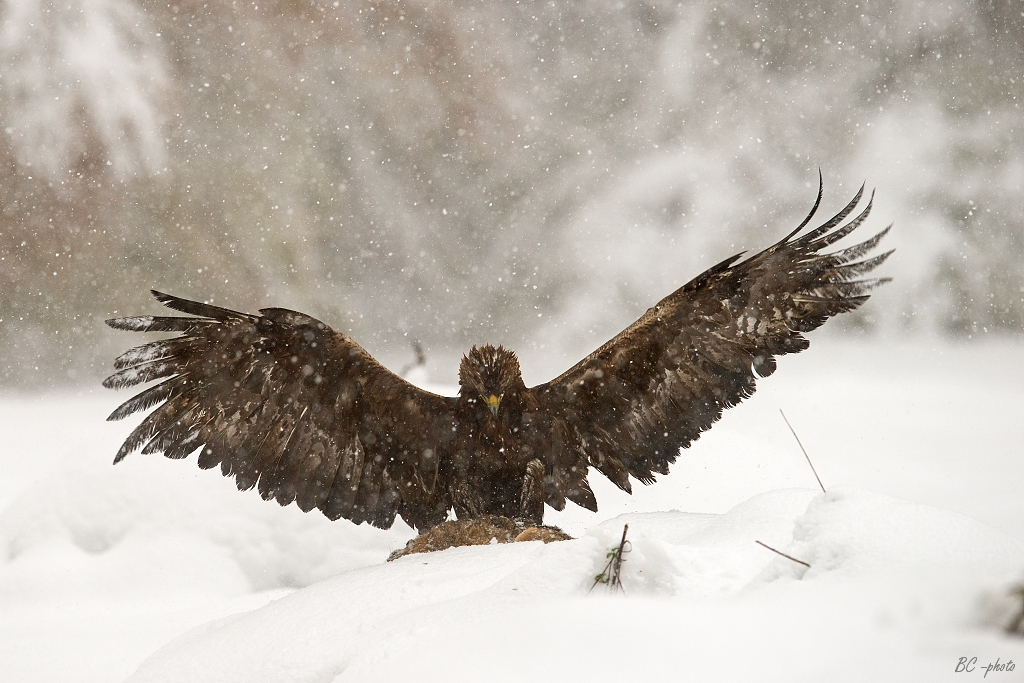
A golden eagle lands on carrion during a snowstorm.

At least seven main hunting techniques are known to be utilized by the species, with many individual variations and the ability in most mature eagles to quickly (and sometimes cleverly) vary back and forth between methods depending on the circumstance. The first described is "high soar with glide attack", where the golden eagle soars at least 50 m (160 ft) above the earth. Once it spies a prey item, the eagle partially closes its wings and enters a long, low-angled glide which can carry it over distances of 1 km (0.62 mi) with the speed increasing as the wings close more. Just prior to impact, the wings are opened, the tail fanned and feet thrust forward to grab the prey, creating a booming sound, causing by the wings whipping against the wind, in the instant before the strike that sounds like a clap of thunder. This technique is used for solitary or widely dispersed prey found in openings, such as hares or ptarmigans. A variation of the high soar where a lofty perch is used instead of soaring flight has been observed.

The next major hunting methods is the "high soar with vertical stoop", which is used to attack birds in flight. Since they are outpaced and out-maneuvered by swift-flying birds, they can only usually attack slower-flying species such as geese and cranes. The golden eagle also requires a height advantage over their prey for this rarely observed technique to succeed. In one observed case, some Canada geese (Branta canadensis) in Montana were able to avoid predation by a golden eagle hunting them in this way by collectively gaining flying height. In another observation, a golden eagle was successful in knocking a ptarmigan out of a flying covey in Scotland.

The next hunting method is the "contour flight with short glide attack", which is considered the most commonly utilized hunting method for golden eagles. This consists of a low-level quartering flight often at only 5 to 15 m (16 to 49 ft) above the ground so they do not break the sky-line when observed from the ground and they can hug the contours of the earth below. This method is useful for hunting colonial (often burrowing) prey such as ground squirrels, densely populated leporids or birds found in concentrations, such as breeding grouse or even seabirds. The individual prey item is apparently selected in a manner of seconds before the strike. If the first attempt fails, the eagle may fly around and attempt to ambush the prey again.

The next hunting method is the "glide attack with tail-chase", which commences with a low-angled stoop some distance from the quarry. The prey is then chased closely, whether a hare running evasively or a grouse in flight. The key to success is eagle's agility and the prey's inability to find cover. In one case, a flying greater sage-grouse (Centrocercus urophasianus) was caught by a pair of eagles using this technique.

The next major hunting method is "low flight with slow descent attack". In this, the golden eagle quarters low below the earth and then gradually swoops down on the prey. This is used for slow-moving prey, such as tortoises and hedgehogs, or any prey item with a general absence of escape behavior. This includes any potentially dangerous prey items, such as rattlesnakes and foxes. When hunting mammalian carnivores, the eagle may hover for some time over the potential prey and not press the attack unless the mammal looks down.

The next is the "low flight with sustained grip attack", which is used for hunting ungulates. Here, the golden eagle flies over a herd of ungulates which in turn often huddle or break into a run. The eagle then selects it prey (typically young animals, though sometimes infirm or exceptionally healthy grown animals) and lands on prey's back or neck, talons gripping firmly, attempting to pierce vital organs or cause shock via a crushing grip to bone and cartilage. The hunting eagle typically rides its prey for several minutes with wings outstretched and flapping to maintain balance until the prey collapses, either as result of exhaustion, shock or internal injury.

The final major hunting method is the "walk and grab attack", in which the eagle walks on the ground and attempts to pull its prey out of cover. This has been used for pulling jackrabbits out of brush but has even been utilized to grab the young of large prey (i.e. deer, sheep and badgers) from under the mother's legs. Tandem hunting may be done regularly, especially with larger prey items. Reportedly, while hunting in pairs, the male golden eagle flies in front of the female at a higher elevation and usually initiates the attack. Breeding pairs have been recorded hunting jackrabbits cooperatively with one individual following the other at different elevations above the ground. The initial pursuer diverts the prey's attention by stooping while the second flies in unseen to make the kill. A study in Idaho showed that the success rate was lower during tandem hunting (9%) than during solo hunting (29%), but this may have been due to the more difficult nature of the prey targeted during tandem hunts. As a whole birds are reportedly more difficult prey to capture than mammals, so hunting success rates may be lower where birds outrank mammals in importance as prey. Golden eagles are not above scavenging for carrion. In fact, it makes up a significant portion (sometimes a majority) of the diet in winter, when ground squirrels are in hibernation and rabbits and hares tend to be at population lows. In the Greater Yellowstone area, the golden eagle was one of the most frequent scavengers to attend wolf kill-sites in winter but, unlike common ravens (Corvus corax) and bald eagles, were not frequent at kills left out by human hunters. In many parts of the range (i.e. Alberta, Scotland, Spain, etc.) carrion was readily fed to the young during the breeding season.

== Prey ==
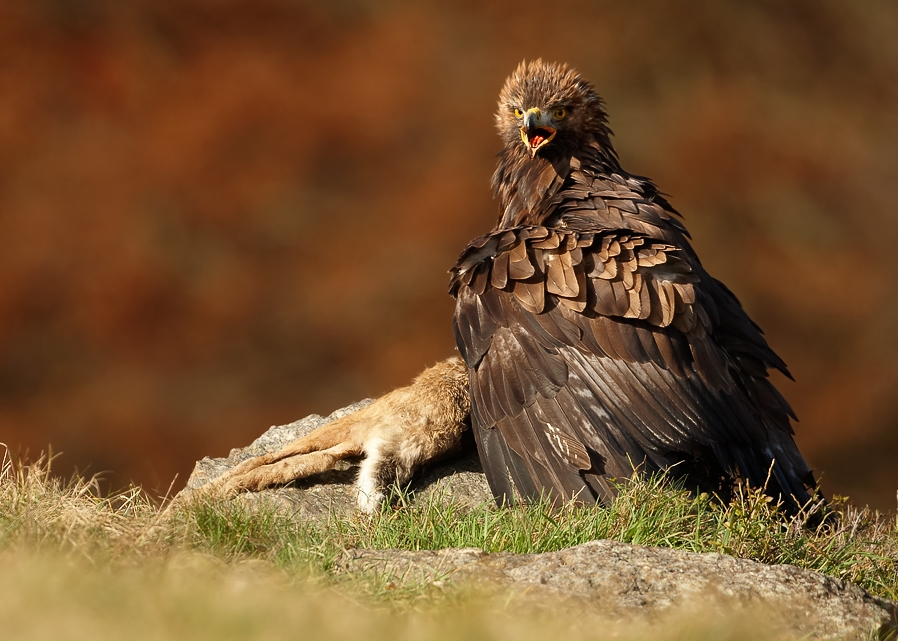
Golden eagle with a freshly caught European hare

Golden eagles are opportunists and virtually any animal of a reasonable size may be predated. Well over 400 species of vertebrate have been recorded as prey. Prey selection is largely determined by the local availability and abundance of prey species. They normally prefer wild, native prey but can easily adapt to domesticated and/or exotic animals, most often when the prey returns to a feral state. This is most apparent on islands that have very few (or no) native land mammals, such as Corsica in France, Santa Rosa and Santa Cruz Islands in California and many of the Inner and Outer Hebrides of Scotland. Most analysis of dietary habits of raptors results from examining the prey remains around an active eyrie at the end of the breeding season (September or October), based on pellets, skeletons and skins found. This method is not comprehensive for prey analysis, as particularly small prey may leave no trace and it cannot take into account the prey selected by wintering adults and highly nomadic juvenile eagles (both of which are believed to include a higher level of carrion and large prey items). However, since eye-witness accounts of hunting and close monitoring of prey brought to the nest are both rare and likely to disturb the eagles, this is the best known method of studying the eagle's prey. Studies have revealed that the average golden eagle nest contains 3.57 species of prey, although there is considerable variation in the dietary breadth across the range, ranging from an average of 11.2 species in the French Pyrenees to a mere 1.4 in Alaska. In general, the dietary breadth is greater in Eurasia than it is in North America, where eagles frequently only need to hunt two or three species throughout the nesting cycle. This is a moderate dietary breadth by the standards of the genus Aquila, and not remarkable when compared to some other raptors. Overall prey weight has ranged from 10 g (0.35 oz) to at least 114 kg (251 lb), although most prey taken are around half the weight of the preying eagle, with a typical prey weight range of 0.5–4 kg (1.1–8.8 lb) but mostly in the lower half of that range. Studies have shown an estimated mean prey weight of 1.614 kg (3.56 lb) for golden eagles across their range. Only 15.8% of prey weighs over 4 kg (8.8 lb). At a nest studied in Mongolia, prey items were found to be heavier than those known elsewhere in the range, with an estimated mean weight of around 3 kg (6.6 lb). The average estimated weight of prey taken by most other Aquila species is generally much lower but the wedge-tailed eagle seemingly takes prey of a similar weight (both in average and range of prey weights) while the Verreaux's eagle average prey weight is higher, probably over 2 kg (4.4 lb).

The most significant group of prey for golden eagles is mammals. In 59 studies of the breeding season diet across the range, 63.2% of prey remains were of mammals. The diet in North America is particularly skewed towards mammals with roughly 84% of prey items being mammalian. After mammals, other birds were most significant, comprising about 26.8% of prey. Reptiles comprised about 7% of prey from across the range, with other prey groups comprising the remaining 3%. All the diverse groups of prey are examined below, using mainly the aforementioned 59 dietary studies.

=== Leporids ===
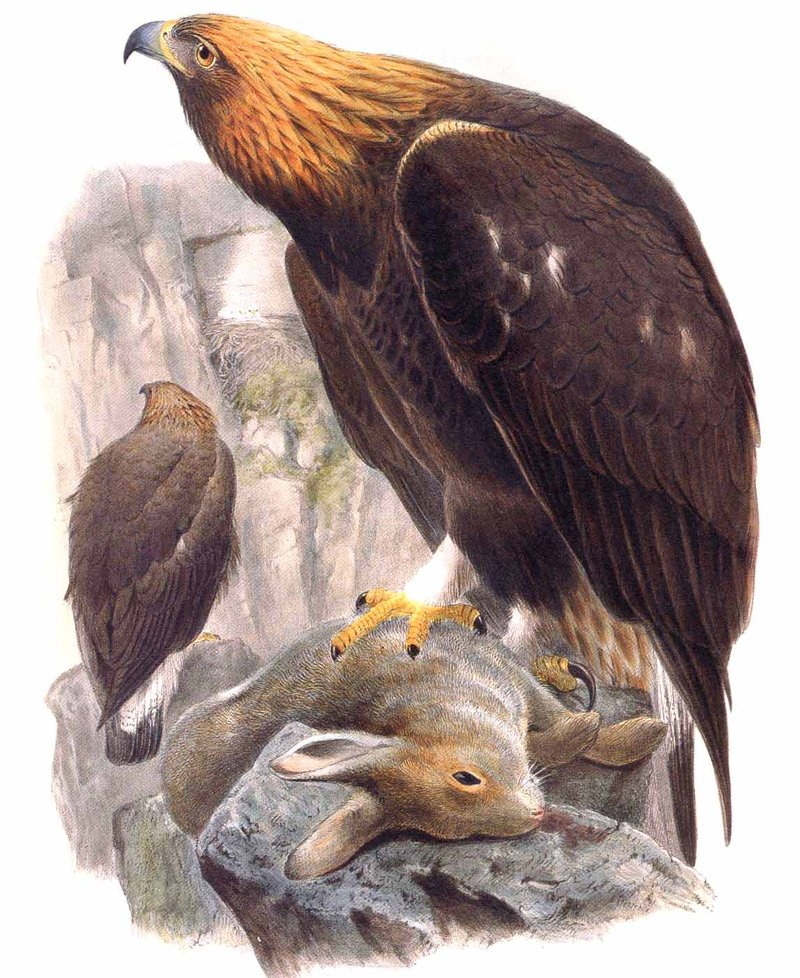
Painting depicting a golden eagle that has caught a mountain hare

The family Leporidae (rabbits and hares) is easily the most significant prey group, comprising about 32% of prey known to be taken by golden eagles. Twelve out of sixteen dietary studies in North America showed leporids as the most common prey group, in some areas comprising over 75% of prey remains. In the northern Rocky Mountains and Northern Plains areas, the main prey species are the white-tailed jackrabbit (Lepus townsendii) and the mountain cottontail (Sylvilagus nuttallii). In the Southwest, the Great Basin, and most of California, the main prey species are the black-tailed jackrabbit (Lepus californicus) and the desert cottontail (Sylvilagus audubonii), the former being especially important, comprising about a quarter of North America prey items in a 1976 study. In two studies in southern Idaho, the black-tailed jackrabbit and the two cottontails dominated the diet, comprising over 70% of nest remains. More locally other jackrabbits and cottontails may be taken in smaller numbers. The snowshoe hare (Lepus americanus) is thought to be the dominant prey species in the boreal forests of Canada but there have been no dietary studies conducted there. The snowshoe and the larger Arctic hare (Lepus arcticus) are some of the most significant prey species in Alaska, though in one central Alaskan nest they were secondary to ptarmigan and nests in Denali National Park included only 0.4% leporid remains. Nests in Alberta and Washington had almost no leporid remains as well.

19 out of 45 studies in the Palearctic listed leporids as the most common family of prey for golden eagles. Important prey species include the mountain hare (Lepus timidus) (in the Scottish Highlands and the French Alps), the European rabbit (Oryctolagus cuniculus) (in the Scottish Highlands, Sicily, the Apennine Mountains, Switzerland, Spain, the Central Massif of France and the French Alps, in the first two sites mentioned, the rabbit is invasive species introduced by humans), the brown hare (Lepus europaeus) (in Switzerland, the Apennine Mountains, the French Alps and Armenia), the Japanese hare (Lepus brachyurus) (in Japan), the Cape hare (Lepus capensis) (in Mali and Niger) and the Ethiopian highland hare (Lepus starcki) (in the Bale Mountains) In some areas leporids are secondary prey, such as Scandinavia, where the mountain hare comprised about 20% of prey items, the maximum known being 28.4% in Northern Finland. The tolai hare (Lepus tolai) was a secondary prey item in Mongolia, making up around 21% of prey. The European rabbit appears to be secondary in Hungary, where it comprised 14.3%.

The estimated typical range of weights of hares hunted by golden eagles is 1.36 to 3.7 kg (3.0 to 8.2 lb), whereas rabbits hunted weigh a little under 1 kg (2.2 lb) on average. Except for the occasional Arctic hare, white-tailed or antelope jackrabbit (Lepus alleni), most leporids hunted in North America weigh 2 kg (4.4 lb) or less, including the smallest hare in the world, the 1.45 kg (3.2 lb) snowshoe hare, and the smallest rabbit in the world, the 400 g (0.88 lb) pygmy rabbit (Brachylagus idahoensis). In Europe, where the large brown and mountain hares, both sometimes weighing over 5 kg (11 lb), are habitually hunted, the prey may be dismembered before being brought to the nest. Across the golden eagle's range, hares and rabbits are generally known to be hunted via either "high soar with glide attack" or "contour flight with short glide attack". Leporids are basically solitary animals but they can occur at high densities, such as when jackrabbits are at their peak numbers in brushy areas of Western North America or (historically at least) rabbits in similar brush habitats on the Iberian Peninsula. The goal of the golden eagle while hunting hares and rabbits is to catch the prey when it is foraging out in the open. If the leporid becomes aware of the eagle's descent upon them more than a few seconds before the strike, they invariably break into a fast, hopping run. Once contact is made, rabbits and hares will often kick or try to bite the eagle but escape is unlikely once they are pinned to the ground. In some case they are able to reach vegetative coverage and, if the said cover is sufficiently deep and dense, the eagle cannot pursue them any further. Although rare, golden eagles have been known to use the "walk and grab attack" to pull a leporid out of its cover. Many hunts in Scotland of mountain hare involve a somewhat lengthy tail chase. If the golden eagle is able to intercept a rabbit or hare far out in the open, a twisting and turning tail chase frequently occurs but the odds of survival for the prey are smaller the farther they are from coverage. On occasion, breeding pairs have been observed hunting jackrabbits together, where one will stoop on a gathering of them while the other waits out of sight and assaults one of the jackrabbits being made to run.

=== Ground squirrels ===
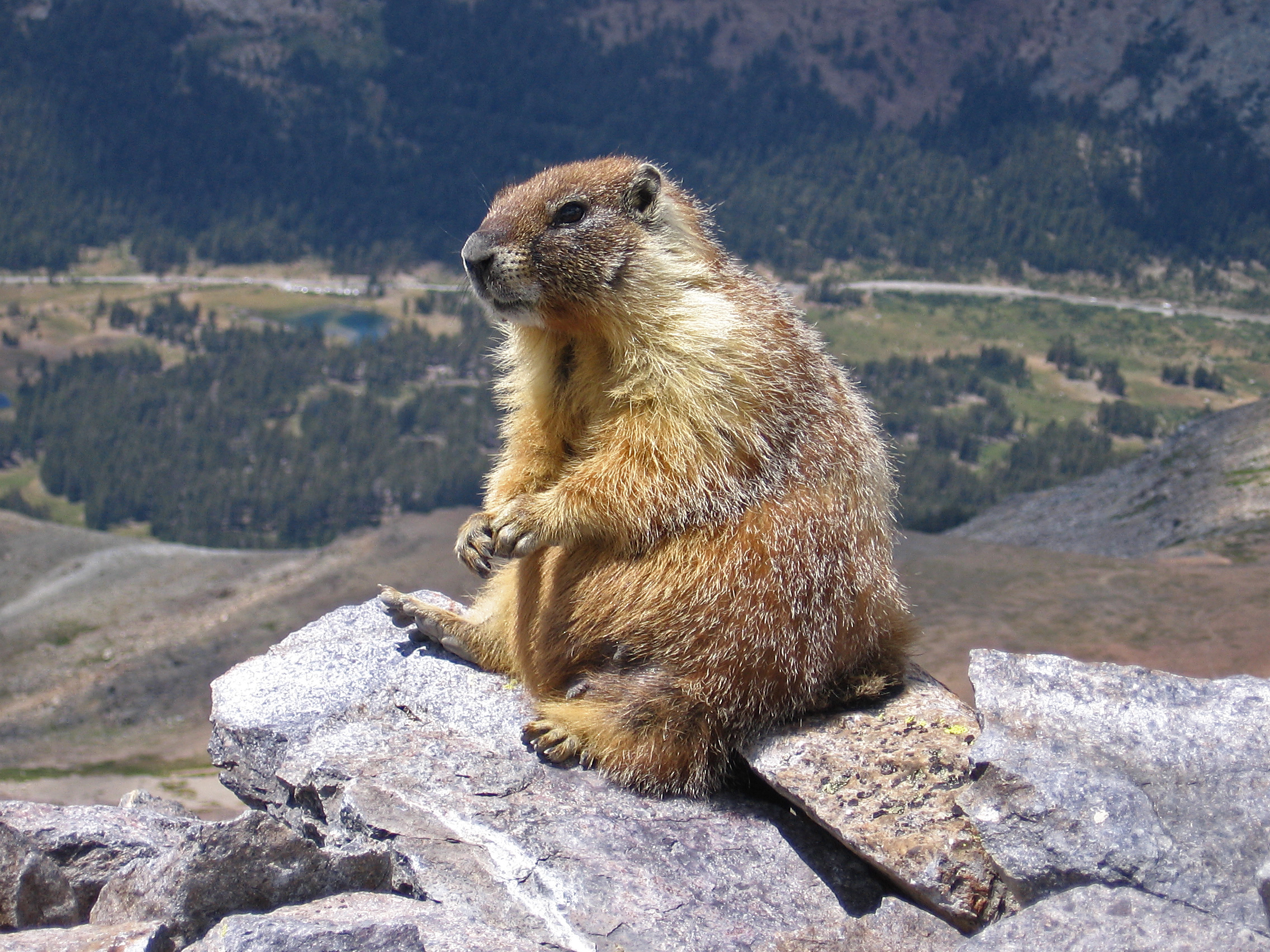
Yellow-bellied marmots are the favored prey for golden eagles in forested areas of Washington state

After the leporids, the next most significant group in the diet of golden eagles is the ground squirrels. They comprise about 11.2% of the prey taken by this species across the range. In areas where leporids are scarce, this group of rodents seems to become more prominent. In many parts of the golden eagle's range, ground squirrels are rare or absent, such as the British Isles, the Iberian Peninsula and some portions of central Eurasia. Nonetheless, about half of the large Spermophilus group, all species of prairie dog, three out of four species of antelope squirrel and nearly all the species of marmot have been found as golden eagle prey. Nests in Denali National Park in Alaska included, among a sampling of 690 remains, contained 84.2% Arctic ground squirrels (Spermophilus parryii). Studies in Alaska have shown that the other major prey species in Alaska, the willow ptarmigan and the snowshoe hare, follow an 8 to 11 year population cycle. The locally abundant ground squirrels have less dramatic population variations and come out of hibernation in mid to late May (shortly after the eagles return from migration). The Alaskan Arctic ground squirrel appears to be eaten supplementally in peak years but then fill the primary niche when the ptarmigan and hare populations crash. In Alberta, Columbian ground squirrels (Spermophilus columbianus) (occasionally supplemented by other species like yellow-bellied marmots) were the primary prey species, making up 84% of the diet of eagles nesting there. In the French Alps, the most significant prey species is the Alpine marmot (Marmota marmota) at 68.9% out of a sampling of 198 from 6 nests. This is also the main prey species in the Italian Alps above the tree line, comprising 49.7% of a sample size of 79 from 12 nests. In the Caspian Sea area of Kazakhstan, yellow ground squirrels (Spermophilus fulvus) are the most important mammalian prey at 23.4% of a sampling of 468 from 36 nests. Along Coastal California, California ground squirrels (Spermophilus beecheyi) replace black-tailed jackrabbits (which are scarce there) as the primary prey species. In Washington, where the golden eagle inhabits mainly forest openings made by humans, the yellow-bellied marmot (Marmota flaviventris) is the main prey species, making up 41.8% of a sampling of 47 from 2 nests and 40.3% of a sampling of 315 from 74 nests. In many other areas, ground squirrels are secondary prey, usually ranking after lagomorphs in dietary significance. This is especially true in the contiguous Western United States outside of Washington state and coastal California where they often register as second, third or even fourth most represented family by remains. Prairie dogs feature only as supplemental prey for breeding golden eagles but wintering eagles reportedly prey heavily on colonies of black-tailed prairie dogs (Cynomys ludovicianus). Although rare, tree squirrels have turned up as prey in some eagle nests in both North America and Eurasia.

Ground squirrels are generally quite social animals and some species even live in cohesive colonies. All ground squirrels live in burrows, which in species like prairie dogs can be quite elaborate. The "contour flight with short glide attack" is essentially the only hunting technique used by golden eagles on ground squirrels. Ground squirrels usually forage within running distance of one of their burrow entrances, so it is essential for the golden eagle to have a surprise factor. Eagles will not enter burrows, unlike some mammalian carnivores that eat ground squirrels. When they hunt ground squirrels, golden eagles seem to choose their victim in the last few seconds before they strike. Most of the ground squirrels targeted by the eagles are quite small, with the entire Spermophilus group and some prairie dogs weighing under 1 kg (2.2 lb). Marmots are a more formidable catch since most species weigh at least 1.5 to 3.5 kg (3.3 to 7.7 lb) in spring and about twice that by fall, which is roughly the highest weight feasible for a flying eagle to carry. Although they may locally target large numbers of juveniles, in other cases they may dismember an adult marmot after a kill so they are able to carry it to the nest. In the Alps, it is believed to be advantageous for eagles to nest below the meadows that host their Alpine marmot prey so they can fly downhill, a much easier flying method while carrying a heavy load than flying uphill.

=== Grouse ===
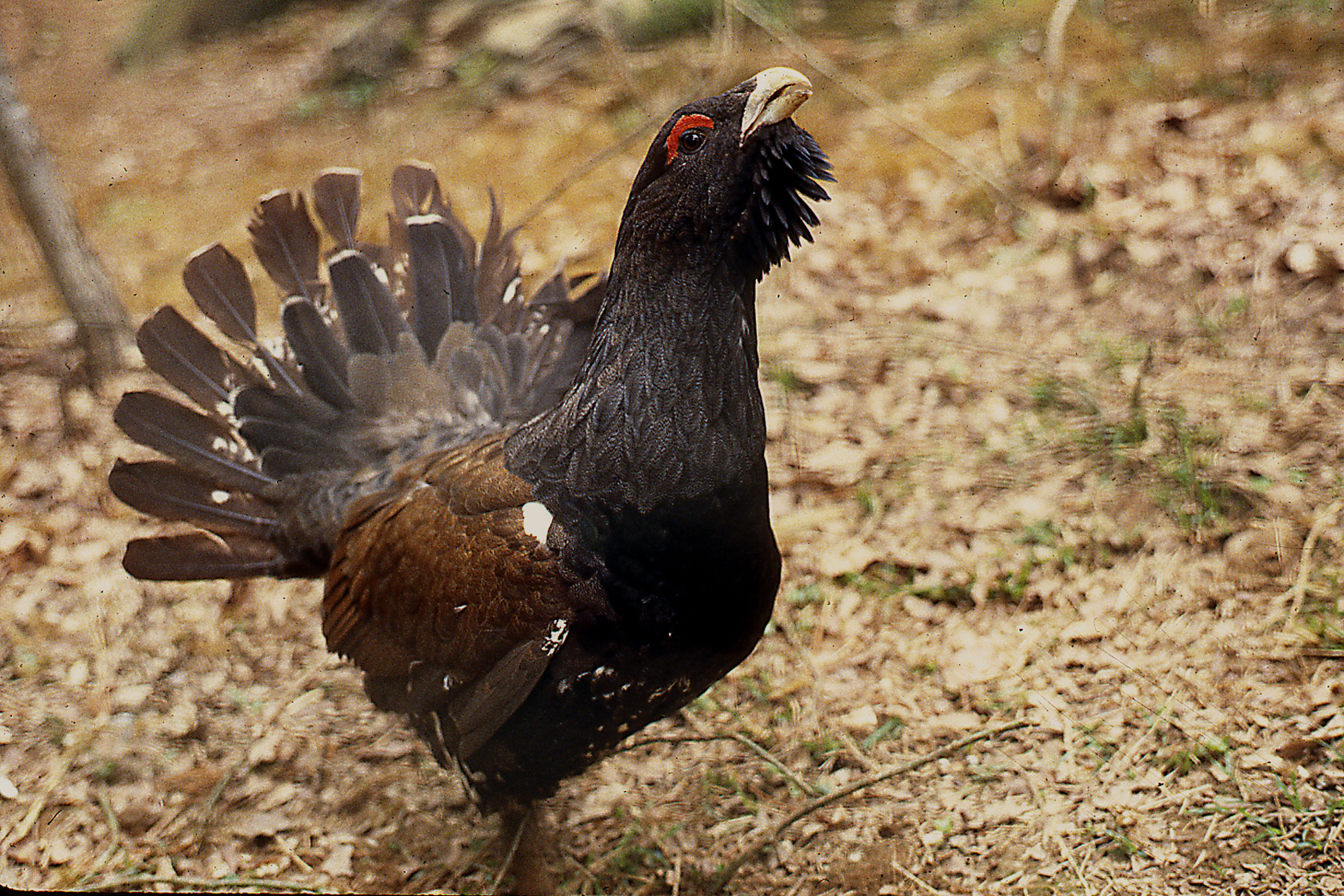
The cock western capercaillie, often favored in the golden eagle's diet

Although absent or rare in some areas where the golden eagle occurs, this is by far the most significant family of birds in the diet of golden eagles, making up 10.3% of their known prey. In Scandinavia and the Baltic States, grouse are the primary prey for these eagles, comprising between 47.6% and 63.3% of their diet, and displacing mammals altogether. The main prey species in most of this sizeable area is the largest species of grouse, the western capercaillie (Tetrao urogallus), supplemented by its cousins, the black grouse (Tetrao tetrix) and the hazel grouse (Tetrastes bonasia). However, in the northernmost parts of Scandinavia, these are replaced by the smaller willow ptarmigan (Lagopus lagopus) and rock ptarmigan (Lagopus muta). A study in Belarus showed grouse were the most common family of prey at 47.8% of the eagle diet. In Estonia, the prey base is more varied, but grouse were still the most represented bird family, comprising 18.1%. The red grouse, a race of willow ptarmigan (Lagopus lagopus scotica), and the rock ptarmigan (also called just ptarmigan) occur heavily in the golden eagle's diet in parts of Scotland, up to 47.8% in one study. One paper in Alaska showed that the two ptarmigan species (primarily the more abundant willow) made up 49.1% of the remains in a golden eagle pair's nest, making it the only known study in North America where birds were more prevalent in the diet than mammals. Other reports from Alaska show the willow ptarmigan as secondary prey. In some other areas, grouse are taken only as supplemental prey. A study in the Italian Alps revealed grouse made up 19.4% of nest remains and were the most common avian prey. In eastern Washington state, sooty grouse (Dendragapus fuliginosus) was the second most significant prey species (at 13%) after yellow-bellied marmot. Considered globally, it is likely that every species of grouse is prey of the golden eagle at least somewhere.

Golden eagles generally hunt grouse using the "contour flight with short glide attack" method, since grouse are often found in small groups. The usual response of the grouse is to take off in flight. If it is able to surprise the grouse, the eagle has a split second to grab the prey before it flies off. The eagle will frequently abandon the hunt after the grouse has flown, since it is unlikely to overtake such prey in the air unless it gains height over its quarry very quickly, although it may be able to gain the appropriate height to tail chase a grouse or even catch it while flying high using the "high soar with vertical stoop attack". In Idaho a juvenile eagle was observed dropping a rock near a dusky grouse (Dendragapus obscurus), possibly attempting to spook it into flight so it could be overtaken from a flying height advantage. Although eagles equally attack both male and female grouse, when cock grouse display on "leks" in spring, they may be more distracted and easily found. Grouse tend to be prey of modest size for golden eagles, many species weighing little more than 1 kg (2.2 lb). An exception is the adult cock of the western capercaillie, which typically weighs over 4 kg (8.8 lb). In addition to their large size, cock capercaillie are exceptionally aggressive while on a lek and golden eagles have been observed to use different, bolder tactics while hunting them, even landing at the lek to confront and overpower feuding grouse. In Sweden, most of the capercaillie remains appeared to be those of the more modestly sized adult females.

=== Pheasants ===
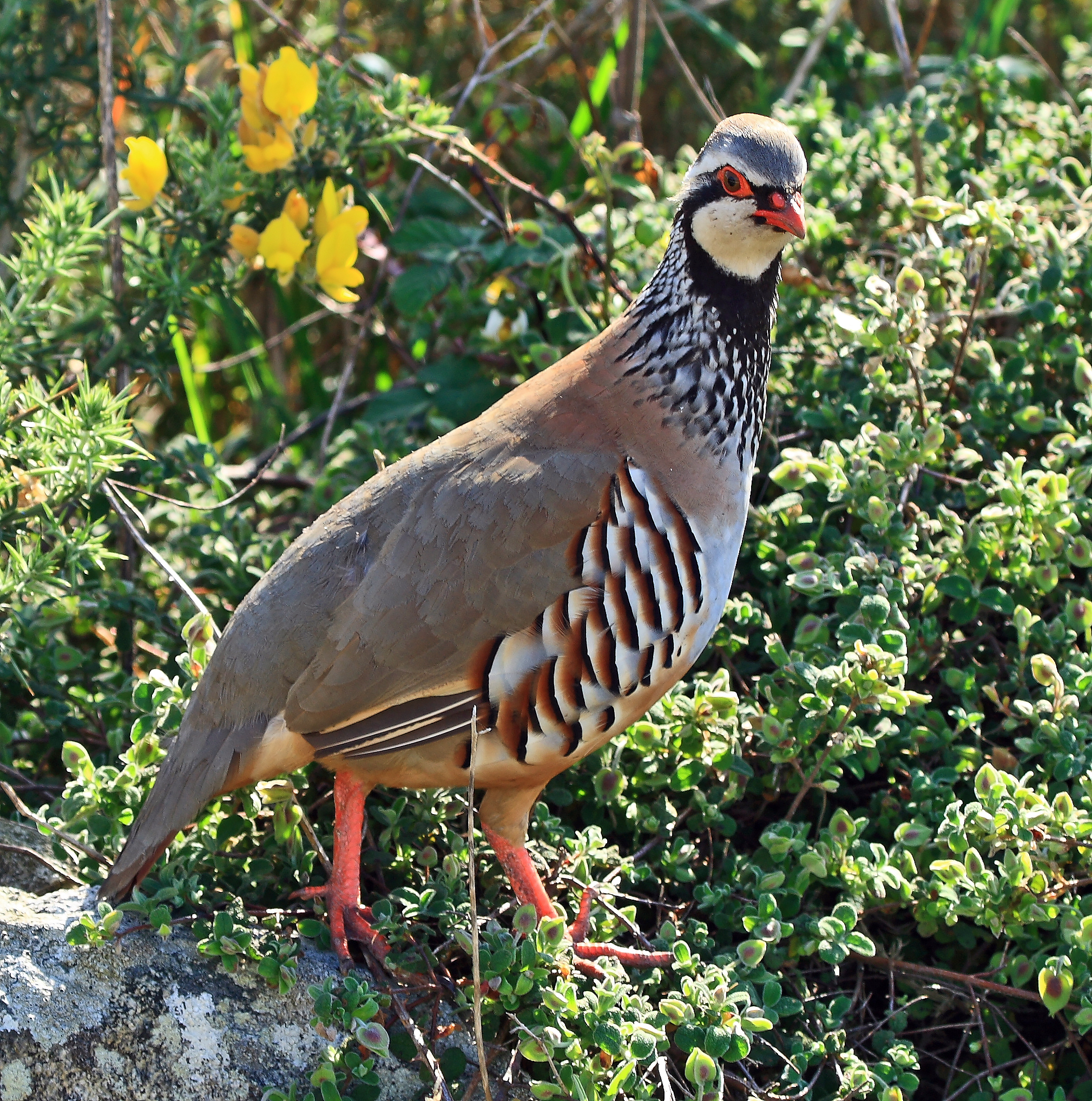
The red-legged partridge is the golden eagle's favored avian prey in Spain

In generally warmer areas of the Eurasian continent, the diverse pheasant family replaces the grouse as the significant group of birds in the golden eagle's diet. Across the range, pheasants make up 5.7% of the diet of this species. Unlike grouse, pheasants are not known to comprise more than half of the nest remains in any study, but they can be important nonetheless. This is especially true in Spain, where most studies show that the pheasants at 22.8-28.7% of the diet, mainly the red-legged partridge (Alectoris rufa), are the second most prominent prey species after the European rabbit, with the red-legged partridge and the rabbit collectively making up to more than 90% of the prey remains in several nests there. The red-legged species, along with the rock partridge (Alectoris graeca) and grey partridge (Perdix perdix), are the leading prey group in the French Pyrenees at 15.8% of a sampling of 114 from 10 nests. In Hungary, the common pheasant (Phasianus colchicus) appears to be the favored prey species, making up 26.6% of the prey of a sampling of 49 from 4 nests there. In Japan, the copper pheasant (Syrmaticus soemmerringii) is the second most common single prey species, making up 17.8% of the remains (sample size of 967 from 5 nests). In the Caspian Sea area of Kazakhstan, the most common bird species (and third most common overall prey species) is the chukar (Alectoris chukar), representing 19.5% of a sampling of 468 from 36 nests. Chukar and Caspian snowcock (Tetraogallus caspius) are reportedly the primary avian prey species in Armenia. In the Himalayan region, two very large pheasants, the Himalayan monal (Lophophorus impejanus) and the Himalayan snowcock (Tetraogallus himalayensis), are reportedly among the most significant prey for eagles. Moorland francolin (Scleroptila psilolaemus) were reportedly the most common bird prey species in Ethiopia's Bale Mountains, comprising 10% among a sample size of 49 at 4 nests. North America has fewer native pheasants species but introduced species such as grey partridge, ring-necked pheasant and, especially, chukar are readily hunted (native quail seem to be largely or entirely ignored as prey by golden eagle, perhaps because of their small size or dense thicket-dwelling habits). The chukar is the most significant bird species in the diet in Nevada (at 5.4%) and the second most significant bird species in Washington state (at 11.8%). One native North American "pheasant" known to be occasionally hunted is the wild turkey (Meleagris gallopavo), the largest species of galliform. The golden eagle is the only major avian predator of adult turkeys. The hunting techniques used on pheasants are probably similar to those used for grouse. Pheasants hunted by golden eagles are also similar in size in grouse. Alectoris sp. weigh around 500 g (1.1 lb) and medium-sized species weighing around 1 kg (2.2 lb). Snowcock will often weigh 2.5 to 3 kg (5.5 to 6.6 lb), whereas the female and male adult turkey weigh around 4 kg (8.8 lb) and 8 kg (18 lb), respectively. On a wildlife monitoring camera in Tennessee, a golden eagle was filmed assaulting an adult turkey, appearing to use a "contour flight with short glide attack" but the quarry in this case appears to successfully avoid the strikes by running and then ultimately flying away. Breeding pairs of eagles have been known to hunt turkeys cooperatively.

=== Ungulates ===
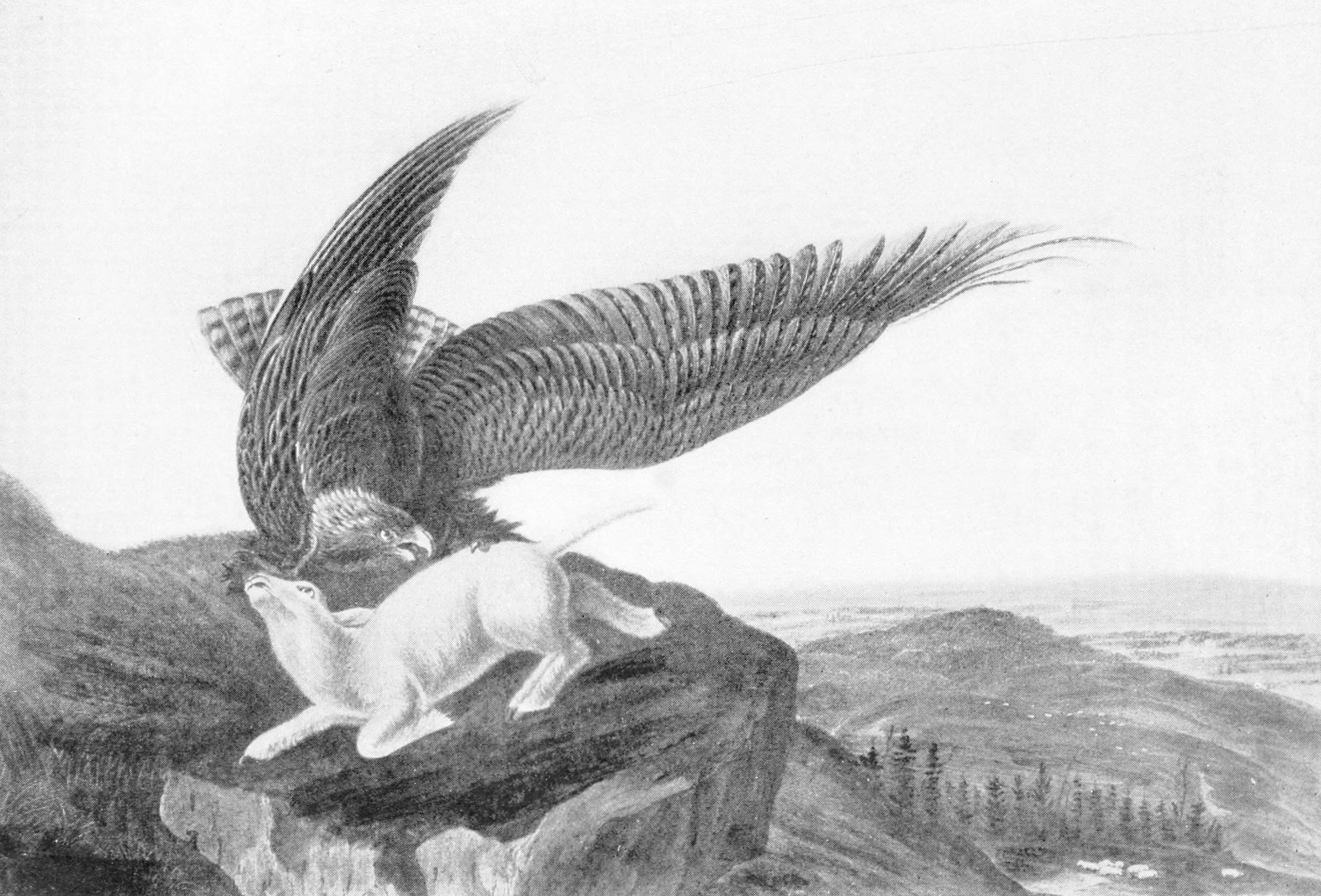
John James Audubon's illustration of a golden eagle attacking a lamb

The contribution of ungulates to the diet of golden eagles has long been the most controversial and debated aspect of the species' whole biology. In total, deer comprise about 4.97% of all golden eagle food, bovids about 4.92%, pigs about 0.71% and pronghorns less than that. The occasional hunting by eagles of domestic stock and preferred game species has been used as the justification for population control. Sheep farmers in Scotland have historically claimed that up to 80% of deaths in their flocks were caused by eagles. Leslie Brown claimed, to the opposite extreme, that it was "physically impossible" for a golden eagle to kill any ungulate scaling several times their own weight. The truth lies somewhere in between. Almost all predation on live ungulates is directed at lambs, fawns or kids and these mostly in the first few months of life. Once they exceed a certain size, it is not practical for breeding eagles to predate the growing ungulates, not only due to the difficult and dangerous nature of the kill but also the fact it would be too heavy to carry to the nest.

==== Sheep, goats, and pigs ====
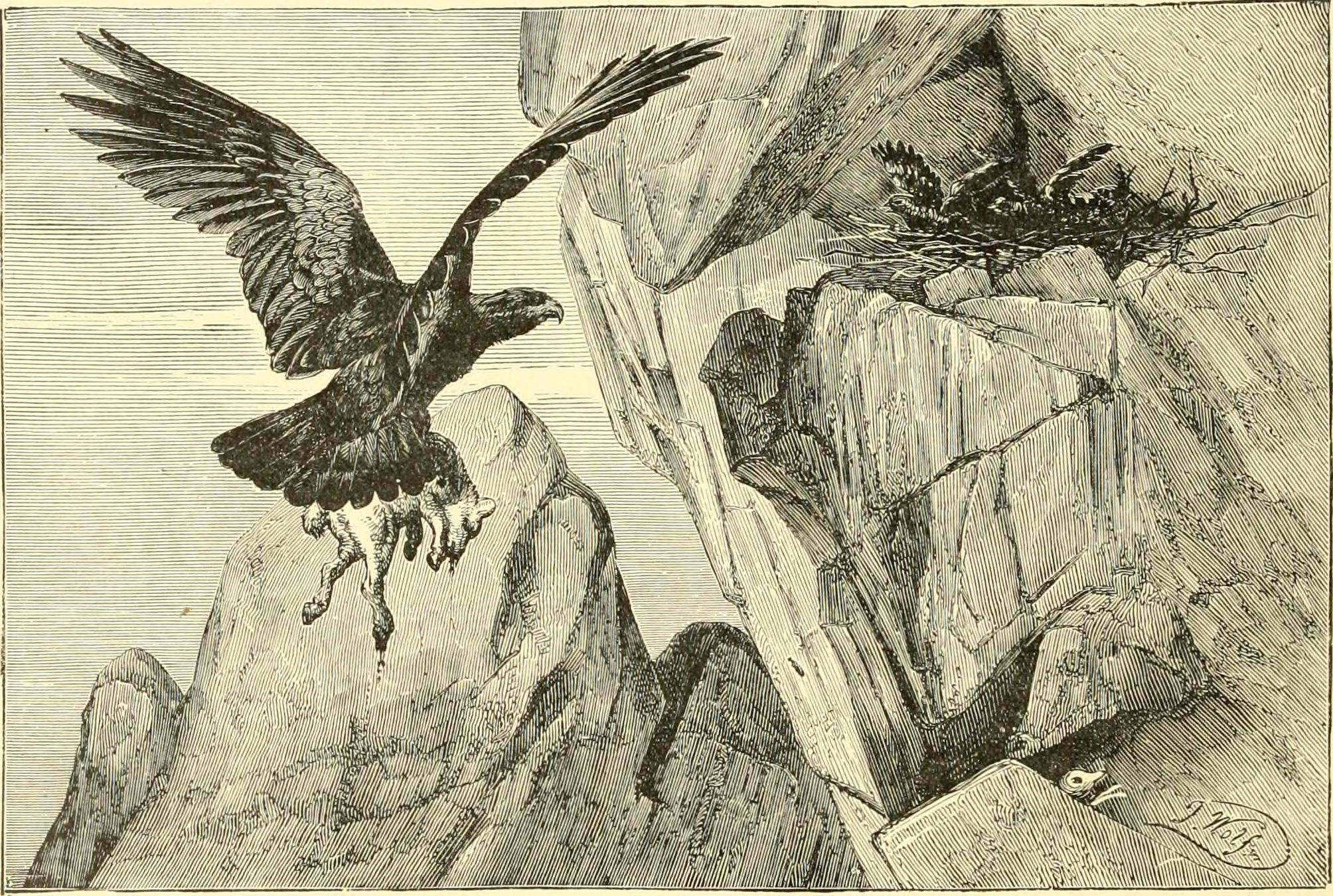
Illustration of golden eagle bringing a lamb to the aerie, in Richard Lydekker's The Royal Natural History (1893–1896), signed by Joseph Wolf

Sheep (Ovis aries) are sometimes eaten in considerable numbers, especially in the Inner and Outer Hebrides of Scotland (25.9% and 26.8% of nest remains respectively). Differentiating whether a lamb has been caught and killed while alive or scavenged as a carcass is possible if the remains are in good condition. In one examination of 10 such remains in nests in Scotland, it was found that 3 lambs had been taken alive and 7 after they had died. This suggests the majority of lambs are taken as carrion, which is reinforced by the fact that much ungulate carrion found around active nest sites in Scotland is already in a malodorous and putrid state. Domestic goats (Capra hircus) are occasionally predated as well. Goats slightly outnumbered sheep in the diet of eagles breeding on Corsica, with both domesticated animals making up 20.5% of the diet there and being the most important food source. In North America, lambs and goats were found to comprise less than 1.4% of all prey items. In Montana, it was found that most predation on lambs by golden eagles was committed by juvenile eagles or eagles that failed to breed (which have no need to carry prey to a nest). There it was found that the hunting of domestic stock peaks during wet, cold springs that seemed to adversely effect the local abundance of jackrabbits. The eagle scavenges extensively on, and occasionally kills, wild species of caprine as well, such as mountain goats (Oreamnos americanus), bighorn sheep (Ovis canadensis), Dall sheep (O. dalli), bharal (Pseudois nayaur), chamois (Rupicapra rupicapra) and muskoxen (Ovibos moschatus), primarily young individuals, though there are reports of golden eagles killing adults. Pigs (including feral and domestic varieties) are occasionally taken, especially in insular populations. Studies showed pigs (most certainly taken as carrion) made up to 13.3% of the diet in Corsica and 43.1% on Santa Cruz Island, California. Few wild pigs co-exist with golden eagles but wild boar (Sus scrofa) (likely only as piglets or carrion) have been taken in Bulgaria.

==== Deer ====
Of wild species of ungulate, deer are the preferred prey family. In a study in the Italian Alps, the most common prey species of all was the European roe deer (Capreolus capreolus), which made up 32.2% of nest remains. The roe deer was also a prominent prey item in the French Pyrenees (14.9%) and Switzerland (14.6%), respectively. In several parts of the Scottish Highlands, red deer (Cervus elaphus) are eaten with some regularity, the maximum representation there being 22.3% of prey remains in the Northwest Highlands. In North America, several deer species, but mainly mule deer (Odocoileus hemionus) fawns, were significant in the diet in Washington (14.3%) and California (12.7%). Around the Himalayas, the small white-bellied musk deer (Moschus leucogaster) is reportedly a favorite prey item (though no quantitative analysis are known). In the near Arctic regions of Scandinavia, reindeer (Rangifer tarandus) of both semi-domestic and wild stock are fed on with some regularity; one study in northern Sweden found reindeer formed 11.4% of prey items. In the northernmost stretches of Alaska, golden eagles are more scarce than in equivalent areas of Scandinavia and only occasionally hunt wild reindeer. However, golden eagles were reportedly the most prolific predator of neonatal calves from the Porcupine caribou (Rangifer tarandus granti) herd of central Alaska. Partial moose (Alces alces) remains have been found at a nest in Sweden. Live fawns and carrion probably comprise most of the golden eagle's consumption of deer (certainly in larger-bodied species such as red deer). Among wild bovids, eagles are reportedly the main predator of Saiga antelope (Saiga tatarica) calves in Mongolia and are regularly reported to take chamois (Rupicapra rupicapra) and Alpine ibex (Capra ibex) calves in Europe. Mongolian gazelles (Procapra gutturosa) comprised about 15% of the remains found at a nest in Mongolia. Up to seven wild species of goat, five other wild species of sheep and at least two wild gazelle species are confirmed golden eagle prey. In North America, pronghorn (Antilocapra americana) are occasionally hunted.

==== Methods of predation and prey size ====
The main method of predation used on ungulates is the "low flight with sustained grip attack", which can take between a few seconds to at least 15 minutes to kill the prey. In studies, the average estimated weight of ungulate prey found in golden eagle nests varied between 2.5 kg (5.5 lb) and 5 kg (11 lb), depending on the location and species involved. In each case, the weight of the ungulate prey is similar to the average newborn weight for that respective species, and most ungulates taken are about the same weight as the eagle. The taking of larger ungulates is exceptional. Still, it has been verified in several cases and is most likely to happen in late winter or early spring when other available prey is scarce and (in most of the range) eagles are not concerned with carrying prey to a nest. In Scotland, golden eagles have been confirmed to kill red deer calves up to 20 kg (44 lb) in mass and have been captured on film attacking an adult red deer but not carrying through with the hunt. Roe deer fawns are preferred prey, but occasionally adults weighing around 30 kg (66 lb) can fall prey to golden eagles. In some cases, adult chamois have been forced off cliff edges by golden eagles, to fall to their deaths, after which they can be consumed. Similarly in Asia, Pakistan golden eagles are known to kill full-grown tahrs (Hemitragus), by attacking on the edge of a cliff and hurtled to its death below. A dismembered adult Mongolian gazelle was observed at a Mongolian nest. One golden eagle was captured on a remote wildlife camera in the Russian Far East killing a young female sika deer weighing 40 to 50 kg (88 to 110 lb), a singular event to capture on film since eagles hunts of even regular prey are difficult to photograph. In North America, golden eagles have successfully attacked and killed pronghorns, from juveniles to adult males. Adult pronghorns typically weigh around 50 kg (110 lb) in females and 56 kg (123 lb) in males, suggesting these mammals are one of the largest live prey species obtained by eagles in North America. Unsuccessful attacks on larger ungulates such as adult mule and white-tailed deer (Odocoileus virginianus) have been recently filmed but there is only a single account that mentions predation on an adult white-tailed deer.

While golden eagles do not usually target large domestic ungulates, a handful of confirmed attacks on relatively large sheep, exceptionally including healthy adults, estimated to weigh around 52 to 70 kg (115 to 154 lb) have occurred in Scotland. One study in Finland found semi-domesticated reindeer calves, of an estimated average weight of 12 kg (26 lb) were routinely killed, and Adult female reindeer weighing 60 to 70 kg (130 to 150 lb) have been killed in three cases in central Norway. Similarly, few records of predation on domestic cattle are known but a detailed examination of calf remains has shown that golden eagles in New Mexico, mainly wintering migrants, killed 12 and injured 61 weighing from 41 to 114 kg (90 to 251 lb) from 1987 to 1989. No other living bird of prey has been verified to kill prey as heavy as this, although wedge-tailed, martial (Polemaetus bellicosus) and crowned eagles (Stephanoaetus coronatus) have been confirmed to kill prey estimated to weigh up to 50 kg (110 lb), 37 kg (82 lb) and 30 kg (66 lb), respectively.

=== Other mammals ===
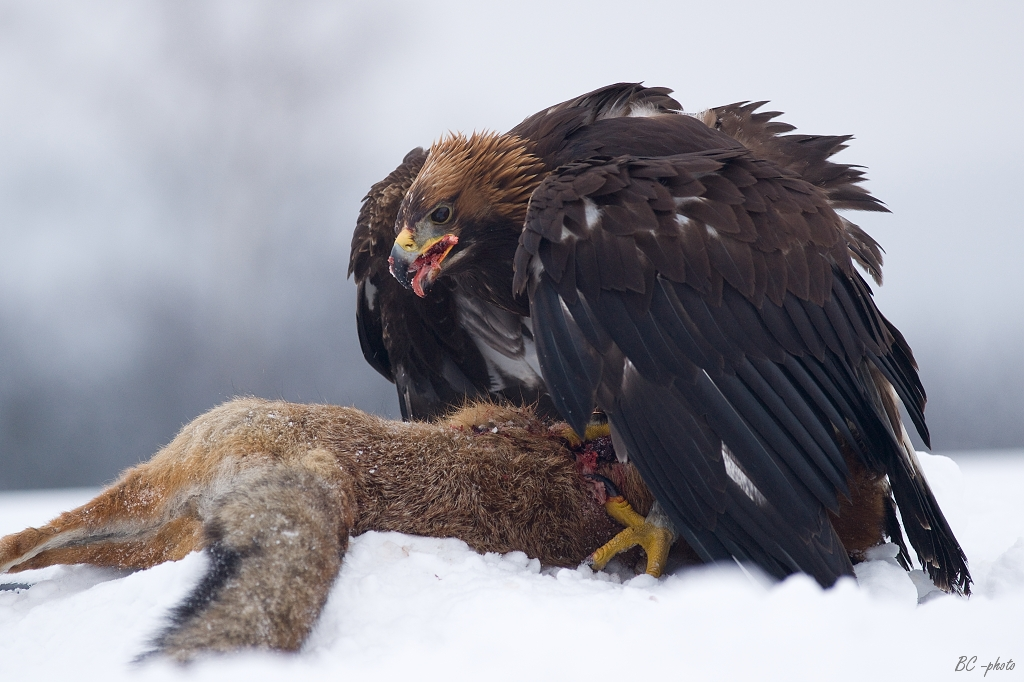
Golden eagle feeding on a red fox, Nasavrky, Czech Republic

Mice, rats, and related species occasionally comprise an important portion of the golden eagle's diet, making up 3.05% of prey throughout the range. Most mouse-sized mammals are too small to serve as regular prey, but in marginal habitats, they can become more important, with studies revealing they sometimes form more than 10% of nest remains. Species preyed on include the North American deer mouse (Peromyscus maniculatus) on Santa Rosa Island and the Santa Cruz Islands, the Norway lemming (Lemmus lemmus) in northern Sweden, the brown rat (Rattus norvegicus) in the northern highlands of Scotland, great gerbils (Rhombomys opimus) in the Caspian Sea region of Kazakhstan, and grass rats (especially Blick's grass rat, Arvicanthis blicki) and the big-headed mole-rat (Tachyoryctes macrocephalus) in the Bale Mountains.

Mammalian carnivores can compete for some of the same prey as golden eagles but can also themselves become prey, the main prey family of carnivores being the canids (dog family). 12 species of canid are known to have been hunted by golden eagles and they collectively make up about 2.8% of the diet from all surveyed golden eagle nests. For the most part, foxes are the preferred prey. In a nest in Mongolia, Corsac fox (Vulpes corsac) were surprisingly the main prey species, making up 38% of sampled remains. Kit fox (Vulpes macrotis), swift fox (Vulpes velox), gray fox (Urocyon cinereoargenteus) and island fox (Urocyon littoralis) are readily predated in North America. In Fennoscandia, golden eagles prey on Arctic foxes (Vulpes lagopus). Across much of both species' ranges, red foxes (Vulpes vulpes) co-exist with golden eagles and eagles hunt them occasionally. Red foxes make up 13.5% of nest remains in Sicily and 5.9% in the Republic of Macedonia. Among red foxes, juveniles are usually targeted as prey, though golden eagles can kill foxes of any age or condition, including fully grown red foxes heavier than the eagles themselves. Occasionally, other canids such as common raccoon dogs (Nyctereutes procyonoides) and even coyotes (Canis latrans), from pups to apparently healthy adult males, can be successfully killed. The golden eagle also rarely takes moderate-sized dogs as prey, including domestic dogs (Canis familiaris). The other family of carnivores that turns up with some regularity in the golden eagle's diet is the mustelids, at about 2.3% of the diet. The largest percentage of mustelids was 13.2% in a nest in central Alaska. Mustelids turned up in large numbers in the French Alps where they made up 10.1% of nest remains. Though small mustelids such as least weasels (Mustela nivalis) can be taken, the members of this family which is most regularly hunted are the martens, such as the American marten (Martes americana), pine marten (Martes martes) and beech marten (Martes foina). Similar sized steppe polecat (Mustela eversmanii) was also taken in Mongolia. In North America, adults of larger mustelids, including fishers (Pekania pennanti) and even American badgers (Taxidea taxus) which can be far larger than an adult eagle, have also turned up as prey. Additionally, wolverines (Gulo gulo), the largest terrestrial mustelid, can be targeted as prey by golden eagles, especially "young and inexperienced" specimens. The young of other large species are also occasionally hunted in Scotland and Ireland, including Eurasian otters (Lutra lutra) and Eurasian badgers (Meles meles). Cats are rarer in the eagle diet, forming 3.4% of nest remains in the French Alps and 2.2% in the Republic of Macedonia. In Sardinia, felid comprised 7.38% of the total prey taken. Among felids, Domestic cats (Felis catus) are mainly taken but wildcats such as Sardinian wildcats (Felis lybica sarda), European wildcats (Felis silvestris) and smaller sand cats (Felis margarita) are also known to be hunted. In Mongolia, pallas cat (Felis margarita) was taken as additional prey. Rarely, the bobcat (Lynx rufus) have been reported as prey in North America. Other carnivores such as striped skunks (Mephitis mephitis), ringtails (Bassariscus astutus), American hog-nosed skunks (Conepatus leuconotus), and common raccoons (Procyon lotor) have been taken by golden eagle reportedly. A handful of accounts from North America and Scandinavia describe golden eagles hunting and flying off with small cubs of American black (Ursus americanus) and brown bears (Ursus arctos), of an estimated weight of 3 to 5 kg (6.6 to 11.0 lb). Similarly, the pups of spotted seals (Phoca largha) and harbor seals (Phoca vitulina) have reportedly been hunted.

The only other family of mammals to be important in the golden eagle's diet is the hedgehogs, though these are only known as prey in Europe. The European hedgehog (Erinaceus europaeus) appears to be the most important prey species on the Swedish island of Gotland, making up 42.5% of sampled nest remains. In Estonia, the southern white-breasted hedgehog (Erinaceus concolor) was the most significant prey species (28.6%). The latter species was also the most important mammalian prey (13.8%) in the a small study in the Sarnena Sredna Gora Mountains of Bulgaria.

Other mammals which in some locations comprise a minor diet component include dormice, pocket gophers, moles, horses, kangaroo rats, porcupines, shrews, pikas, and chinchillas. Over the whole of the golden eagle's range these prey items comprise less than 1% of nest remains, though this figure can be higher locally.

=== Other birds ===
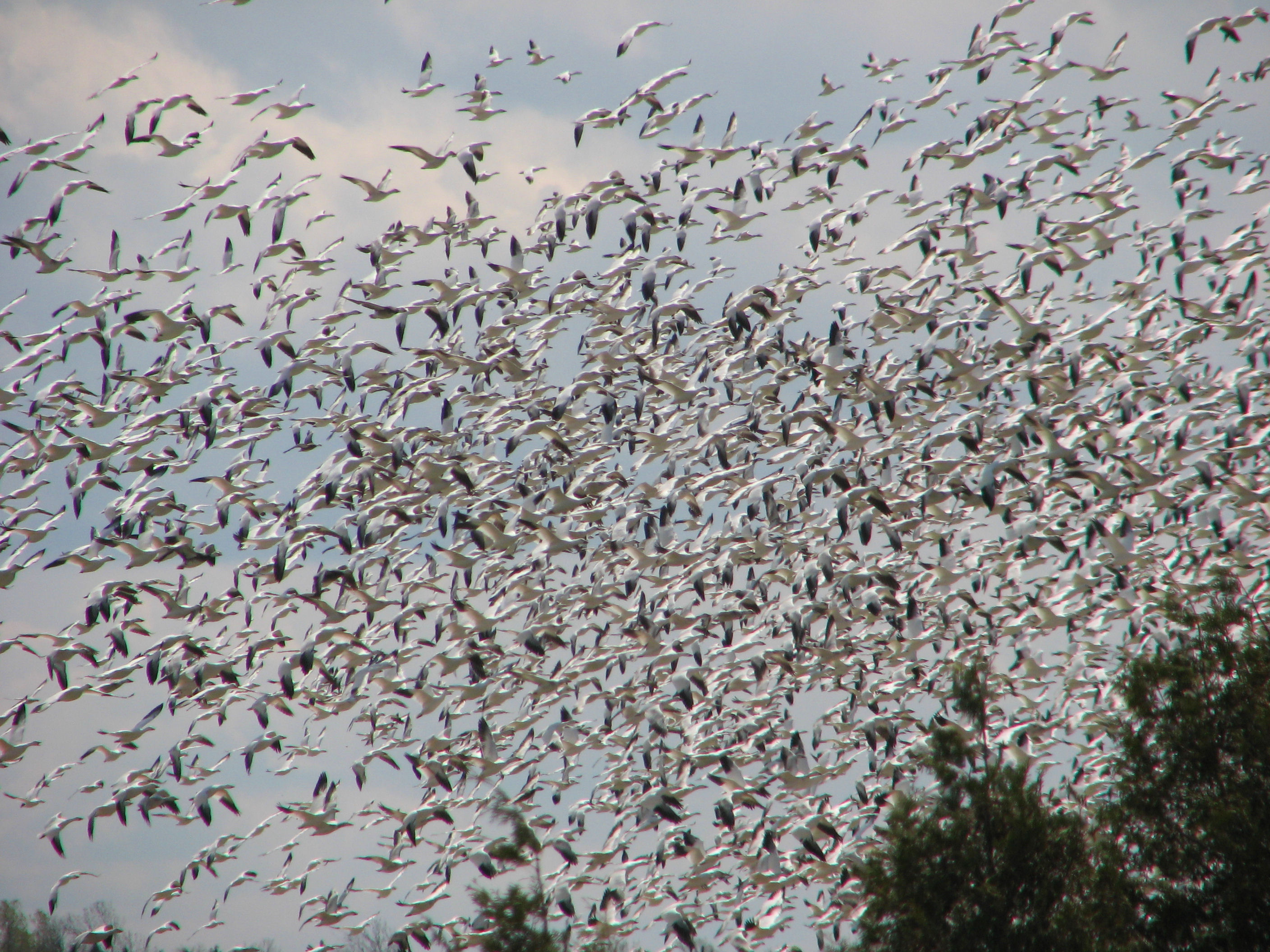
Migratory and wintering flocks of snow geese can attract golden eagles

Although quantitatively outnumbered by mammals, birds are the most diverse class of prey in the golden eagle's diet, as more than 200 species have been identified at eagle nests. Little analysis has gone into how regularly golden eagles will attack the nestling and fledglings of other birds, although it has been interpreted that this behavior is not uncommon. Nestling-aged rock pigeons (Columba livia) have been observed as prey in golden eagle nests. The first record of a golden eagle eating eggs was recorded when a golden eagle was observed consuming Canada goose (Branta canadensis) eggs in eastern Idaho. After galliforms, the next most significant group of prey among birds is the corvid family, making up 4.1% of the diet from around the range. Most prevalent among these are magpies and the large-bodied Corvus (crow and raven) genus. On Santa Rosa and Santa Cruz Islands in California, common raven became the most common prey species after feral pigs were eradicated from the latter, making up 24% of a 454 sample size from 14 nests. The raven was also the most prevalent bird prey in central Arizona, in a sampling of 1154 from 119 nests. The black-billed magpie (Pica hudsonia) was an important prey item in Washington state, making up 9.7% of the remains there, and was the most significant avian prey in Montana. In 10 studies in Europe, corvids made up more than 5% of the prey remains, usually represented by carrion crows/hooded crows (Corvus corone/cornix), rooks (Corvus frugilegus), Alpine chough (Pyrrhocorax graculus), ravens or Eurasian magpies (Pica pica). Smaller species such as jays and nutcrackers only occasionally turn up as prey, mainly in North America, though the Eurasian jay (Garrulus glandarius) has also been known as prey. The next best represented family of birds are the waterfowl, making up approximately 1.4% of the golden eagle's breeding season diet. Waterfowl of all sizes from green-winged teal (Anas crecca) to trumpeter swans (Cygnus buccinator), tundra swans (Cygnus columbianus) and mute swans (Cygnus olor) have been successfully hunted by golden eagles. Full-grown swans can weigh well over 10 kg (22 lb) and are probably the largest birds habitually hunted by golden eagles. Moderately sized species, including larger Anas ducks such as mallards (Anas platyrhynchos) and geese such as bean goose (Anser fabalis) are perhaps most often recorded. Waterfowl are mostly recorded during the nesting season in Northern Europe, comprising 15.4% of prey in Gotland and 14.4% of prey in Belarus. In some years at Malheur-Harney Lakes Basin in Oregon, Anas ducks can make up to 20% of the prey consumed by the locally nesting eagles. Mostly in the United States, wintering golden eagles may become habitually predators of wintering and migrating groups of waterfowl, with species such as Canada geese, cackling geese (Branta hutchinsii), snow geese (Chen caerulescens), and Ross's geese (Chen rossii). Since geese are found in large concentration when seasonal conditions require it, these species can be hunted with relative ease. Waterfowl are typically hunted using the "contour flight with short glide attack" technique, in order to surprise the prey before it can take flight or dive. In one case, a golden eagle was able to capture a mallard as it took off in flight. Other water birds are generally less frequent prey but may become regular in the diet in marsh-like northern regions and coastal areas. Scotland, being surrounded by coasts and possessing quite a wet climate, often hosts water birds which become prey such as colonies of petrels (largely northern fulmar (Fulmarus glacialis)), making up to 17% of the recorded prey in 26 nests with a 119 sample size in the Outer Hebrides, migrating throngs of sandpipers and plovers (up to 5.9% and 2.8% in 25 nest in the northern Inner Hebrides) and gulls (making up a whopping 23% of prey recorded in 25 nests in the West-Central Highlands). Among shorebirds, usually only larger types such as godwits, curlews, Tringa sp., stone-curlews and oystercatchers turn up as prey as smaller species are probably too flighty and agile to catch. Eurasian cranes (Grus grus) are regularly predated in Northern Europe, turning up at 6.8% of nests in Estonia and 5.8% of nests in southern Finland. Hooded cranes (Grus monacha) are reportedly prey for golden eagles in China. Demoiselle cranes (Anthropoides virgo) have been caught in mid-air as they migrate over the Himalayas and both sandhill (Grus canadensis) and young whooping cranes (Grus americana) may be hunted in North America. The last known breeding pair of golden eagles in Maine (which did not return after 1999) were reported to hunt an unusually large number of herons, specifically great blue herons (Ardea herodias) and American bitterns (Botaurus lentiginosus). Elsewhere, herons are basically negligible in the diet. Other water birds recorded as prey include cormorants (up to 8.6% of the recorded prey in Santa Rosa and Santa Cruz Islands), auks, coots, grebes and loons.

Other raptorial birds can sometimes become semi-regular prey, such as various hawks which are recorded largely in North America at locations such as Oregon (8.8% of prey remains) and Arizona. Owls may be hunted occasionally across almost the entire range (maximum being 2.9% in Oregon) and, more rarely, so may the falcons. Rock pigeons may be hunted regularly in some parts of the golden eagle's range (other pigeons and doves have been recorded as prey but are typically rare in the diet). The common feral pigeon was the second most prevalent prey species in Sierra Espuña Regional Park in Spain, making up 18.8% of a sampling of 99 from 5 nests. The species was also prevalent in Slovakia, making up 7.4% of remains at nests there. Non-corvid passerines are usually ignored as prey but large thrushes such as song thrush (Turdus philomelos), mistle thrush (Turdus viscivorus) and common blackbird (Turdus merula), are semi-regularly recorded prey in Europe. This family is most prevalent in Sicily, making up 8.1% of a sampling of 74 from 10 nests there, 7.7% in Central Spain and 7.2% in the French Alps. The smallest-bodied bird family recorded as semi-regular prey are pipits. Meadow pipits (Anthus pratensis) are the most represented species of small birds and are taken mainly in Scotland, making up to 3.5% of prey in the Inner Hebrides. Other bird families rarely recorded as golden eagle prey (making up less than 1% of prey in all studied nests) include, but not limited to starlings (maximum being 4.8% in the French Alps, negligible elsewhere), larks (maximum is 2.3% in the West-Central Highlands of Scotland), emberizid sparrows (up to 1.7% in central Alaska), woodpeckers (up to 1.5% in Alberta), cuckoos, bustards, icterids, shrikes, finches and other sympatric birds from the smallest hummingbirds to as large as ostriches.

=== Reptiles and amphibians ===
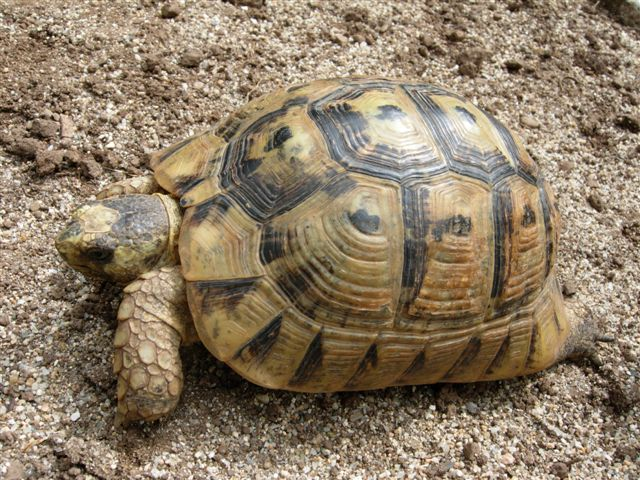
In arid Southeastern Europe, the Greek tortoise is a preferred prey species

Snakes are the most common group of reptiles in the golden eagle's diet, making up about 2.9% of the remains from all studied golden eagle nests, though this figure can be much higher in parts of the range, as shown by studies in Japan (27.5%), Sicily (25.7%, one snake species), Arizona (14.9%, one snake species), Kazakhstan (9.7%, one snake species), and the French Pyrenees (9.7%). Usually colubrid snakes (sometimes called "harmless snakes") are hunted but venomous species are also occasionally taken, especially the prairie rattlesnake (Crotalus viridis) in North America and the European adder (Vipera berus) in Europe.

In some areas tortoises are more important in the diet than snakes, and they displace mammals and birds as the most important prey group in most of Southeastern Europe as well as the Caucasus. Hermann's tortoises (Testudo hermanni) and Greek tortoises (Testudo graeca) made up 55.4% of the prey in two nests in Bulgaria and 52.9% of the prey in 19 nests in the Republic of North Macedonia. The same species are also prevalent in the diet of eagles from Greece, but no quantitative analysis is known from that country. Russian tortoises (Agrionemys horsfieldii) made up 31.9% of the prey in 5 nests in Turkmenistan and 25.4% of the prey in 36 nests in Kazakhstan. When hunting tortoise, golden eagles use a unique technique: they pick up the tortoise and fly up to at least 20 m (66 ft) above the rocky ground, then drop the tortoise onto the terrain below in the hope of smashing open its hard shell. The only other bird species confirmed to hunt vertebrates in this way is the lammergeier (Gypaetus barbatus), although gulls may use a similar technique on hard-shelled prey such as mussels. The larger desert tortoise (Gopherus agassizii) of North America has occasionally turned up as prey there. Other turtles have been reported as being hunted, such as painted turtles (Chrysemys picta) in Washington and baby loggerhead sea turtles (Caretta caretta) in Corsica, but essentially are a negligible part of the diet.

Lizards turn up with some regularity as prey in some of the hotter, drier portions of the golden eagle's range. In Europe, lizards made up to 13% of the prey remains in the French Pyrenees and 12.7% in the Italian Apennines. Fairly large lizards, including the monitor lizard, make the most significant contribution to the golden eagle diet. The most important lizard prey in Europe is the genus Lacerta, i.e. the ocellated lizard (Lacerta lepida). Spiny-tailed lizards of the genus Uromastyx are also of particular note in the golden eagle's diet; they are reportedly the single most important prey for golden eagles in Northeast Africa. In the particularly sparse Negev Desert of Israel, the Egyptian spiny-tailed lizard (Uromastyx aegyptia) apparently comprised 89% of the diet, the most a single species has been reported to dominate a golden eagle's diet locally.

Amphibians, specifically Rana frogs, have been reported in only two locations across the golden eagle's range: in the French Pyrenees, where they made up 2.7% of the diet, and the West-Central Highlands of Scotland, where they made up 0.7%.

=== Other prey ===
Fish have not been mentioned as prey in Eurasia in dietary studies of nesting golden eagles. However, they have been reported in nests in North America. The two largest known reports are from coastal California and along the Porcupine River in Alaska, with fish making up 3.6% and 3.5% of the diets, respectively. Most reported species are trout and salmon from the genera Salmo and Oncorhynchus, although other species have also been hunted, including suckers (Catostomus), Sacramento perch (Archoptiles interruptus) and the northern pike (Esox lucius). Fish have apparently been captured in Scotland on rare occasions, although they have not been reported in the breeding season diet. Golden eagles have been observed around the Sea of Okhotsk (especially along Northern Japan) to join large numbers of white-tailed eagles (Haliaeetus albicilla) and Steller's sea eagles (Haliaeetus pelagicus) in winter to scavenge and capture various, locally abundant fish amongst ice-floes. Perhaps the most improbable prey reported in the golden eagle's diet are insects. They have been reported in small quantities in the French Pyrenees, the Italian Alps and Bulgaria. There is no information on how golden eagles capture insects or what kind of insects they hunt, although slower, larger, terrestrial insects like large beetles seems likely.

=== Interspecific predatory relationships ===
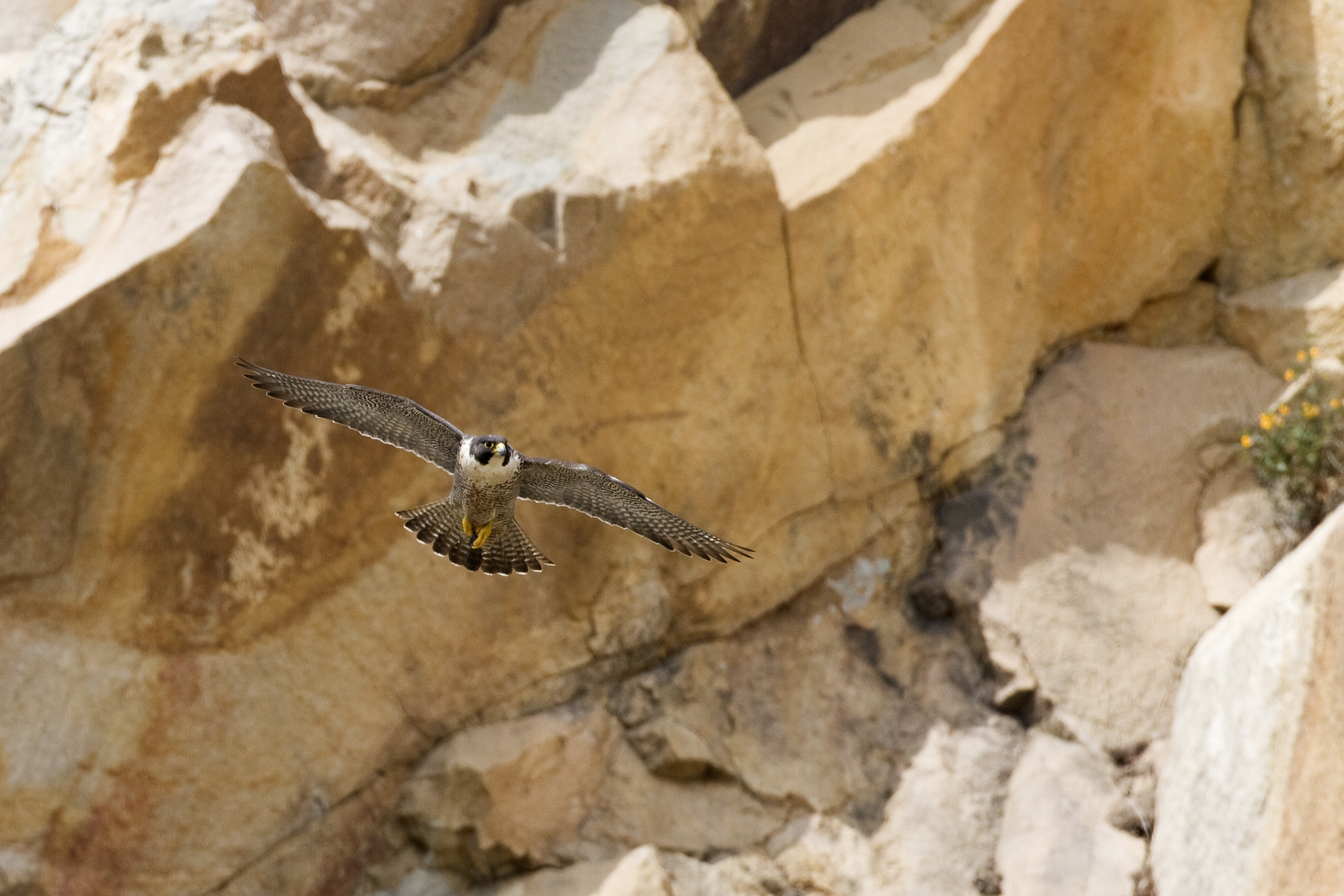
Peregrine falcons are often attracted to the same cliff habitat as golden eagles

One of the most fascinating, though relatively little studied, aspects of the golden eagle's biology is how it interacts with other predators in a natural environment, especially other large predatory birds. The golden eagle is a powerful hunter with few avian rivals in size or strength, although what it gains in these areas it loses somewhat in its agility and speed. Golden eagles are avian apex predators, meaning a healthy adult is not generally preyed upon. There are several other large birds of prey that inhabit the Northern Hemisphere that may be attracted to the same prey, habitats and nesting sites as the golden eagles. Two examples are the common raven and peregrine falcon (Falco peregrinus) as these are two fairly large-bodied, mostly predatory birds that co-exist with golden eagles in almost every part of their range, although the former occurs in much larger numbers and the latter has a much larger natural distribution in more varied habitats. Both the raven and the peregrine are often attracted to much the same precipitous habitat as the golden eagle. However, both are generally dominated by the much larger eagle and will actively avoid nesting in the same area as a golden eagle pair. Ravens and peregrine falcons have both been robbed of food on a few occasions by golden eagles. Both species have turned up widely in the diet of golden eagles, much more so the raven than the peregrine. However, these conspecific species follow no set "rules". Ravens often vigorously and successfully displace golden eagles from their nesting territories. Peregrine falcons have also displaced golden eagles from their nesting territories and, in one instance in Utah, even killed a golden eagle that had breached the area of their nest. In another case, a peregrine falcon kleptoparasitized a willow ptarmigan from a golden eagle. In a study of four cliff-nesting raptor species in Spain, the golden eagle was not observed to engage in agonistic encounters with the other species but the peregrine falcons were dominated by and occasionally killed by a relatively small race of Eurasian eagle-owls (Bubo bubo hispanus). Both ravens and peregrine falcons appear to easily outmaneuver golden eagles in flight.

==== Relationships with smaller diurnal raptors ====
Other raptors, large and small, are often outright dominated by golden eagles. In Eurasia, the relative paucity of mid-sized Buteo species is thought to be due to the radiation of large Aquila eagles that already occupied the large raptor niche and outcompeted them. In North America, where there are no Aquila eagles other than the golden eagle, Buteo species are more diverse with at least 3 large hawks (the red-tailed, Swainson's (Buteo swainsoni) and ferruginous hawks (Buteo regalis)) that occur in similar habitats and sometimes eat similar prey as both each other and golden eagles. On occasion, golden eagles will kleptoparasitize or prey upon these three Buteos. Beyond the aforementioned North American Buteo, other small to medium-sized diurnal raptors are known to occasionally be hunted by golden eagles, including ospreys (Pandion haliaetus), black kite (Milvus migrans), hen harriers (Circus cyaneus), Eurasian sparrowhawks (Accipiter nisus), Cooper's hawks (Accipter cooperii), northern goshawks (Accipiter gentilis), red-shouldered hawks (Buteo lineatus), common buzzards (Buteo buteo), long-legged buzzards (Buteo rufinus), upland buzzards (Buteo hemilasius), rough-legged buzzards, Eurasian kestrels (Falco tinnunculus), American kestrels (Falco sparverius), merlins (Falco columbarius), prairie falcons and gyrfalcons (Falco rusticolus). Occasionally, golden eagles may even boldly predate these smaller species during migration in mid-flight, as was recorded at Hawk Mountain Sanctuary with a red-shouldered hawk. It is thought that on rare occasions, more nimble, smaller raptors like rough-legged buzzards and harriers can kleptoparatisize golden eagles. Northern goshawks in Scandinavia rely on grouse to about the same extent as golden eagles there and even hunt in similar forest edge habitats there. However, the goshawks primarily hunt neonatal and fledgling grouse (30% and 53% of their take of grouse) rather than adult grouse (17% of their prey) in late summer when grouse dominate other birds in their diet, whereas the eagles seem to mainly adult grouse and hunt them regardless of season. Similarly, hen harriers may become somewhat specialized at taking young red grouse, whereas the eagles are more likely to take adults.

Due to the potential danger to themselves and their offspring, almost every other type of raptorial bird readily mobs golden eagles. Gyrfalcons, skuas, and Buteos like rough-legged buzzards, which are normally fierce competitors with each other, have worked together to group-mob golden eagles that have passed their adjacent nesting areas. Occasionally smaller raptors, especially large falcons, will drive eagles to the ground. The eagle typically ignores attacks from smaller species or at least leaves their home ranges, but will occasionally roll and extend talons toward chasing individual often without displaying active predatory behavior. If physical contact occurs, it sometimes ends in injury, death and/or consumption of the attacking species. Remarkably, the nest defense by golden eagles themselves is often rather passive towards other raptorial birds, perhaps since other species may fear predation on themselves if they approach a golden eagle territory. There are exceptions to this, however, when particularly bold, large raptorial birds seemingly range too far into a pair's home range. One pair of golden eagles killed but did not eat three great horned owls (Bubo virginianus), implying that they were killed in nest defense and not in predation. In one of the few cases of a golden eagle killing but not eating another large raptor, an adult golden eagle was observed killing a ferruginous hawk which apparently came too close to its nest.

==== Relationships with scavengers ====
Golden eagles, being habitual scavengers at carrion, come into conflict with scavenging birds as well. They may encounter corvids at carrion sites and the large passerines are often highly cautious, either feeding some distance from the eagle or waiting until the eagle is done eating, lest they be predaceously grabbed. Occasionally, however, corvids may behave more boldly around golden eagles. In one case, a group of three black-billed magpies were observed to rob a golden eagle of its prey. Golden eagles also usually dominate both New World and Old World vultures. Smaller species like black vulture (Coragyps atratus) in North America and Egyptian vulture (Neophron percnopterus) in Eurasia are known to be occasionally hunted by golden eagles. Besides the Steller's sea eagle, the larger species of Old World vulture and the California condor (Gymnogyps californianus) are the only noticeably larger raptorial birds that a golden eagle may encounter. The relationship between these large vultures and golden eagles can be highly contentious, with most sources favoring victory for the eagle due to its more aggressive disposition, much stronger feet and sharp talons. In one case, a colony of griffon vulture (Gyps fulvus) was exceptionally able to displace a pair golden eagles from a cliff where they were trying nest so they could nest there themselves. On the other hand, a 5-year-old griffon vulture reintroduced into the wild in Bulgaria was thought to have been killed by a golden eagle. The golden eagle is a potential predator of the lammergeier which is often attracted to much the same habitat and prey as the eagle but often feeds largely on bone marrow from carcasses. It has been observed that both golden eagles and lammergeiers will readily pirate food away from each other. In the Southwestern United States, several conflicts between huge California condors and golden eagles have been observed. At carrion, victory during conflicts can go either way apparently. Recent observation have suggested that the critically endangered condors do not seem to actively defend their nesting territories from golden eagles but have been recorded gaining incidental protection from prairie falcons and common ravens, which both aggressively displaced the eagles from their own adjacent territories. The golden eagle is considered an occasional predator of California condors (especially fledglings) but there seems to be little in the way of eyewitness accounts to confirm this. It is possible that (as in the Bulgarian griffon vultures) the California condors have lost their natural cautiousness around eagles due to having been reintroduced from captivity.

==== Relationships with owls ====
Owls, which may have dissimilar periods of activity, are not entirely exempt from golden eagle predation either. Several species have been recorded as prey, especially in Northern Europe, Slovakia (where owls make up 2.4% of prey remains) and some parts of the Western United States. Species hunted have ranged in size from tiny Eurasian pygmy owl (Glaucidium passerinum) and little owl (Athene noctua) to the formidable, large great horned, Eurasian eagle and great gray owls (Strix nebulosa). Barn owls (Tyto alba) have been predated by golden eagles in both North America and Eurasia. On Santa Rosa and Santa Cruz Islands, barn owls made up 4.5% of the diet, the largest known occurrence of that species in the eagles' diet. However, the great horned owl is the owl species that occurs most regularly in the diet of North American golden eagles. In Europe, golden eagles are relatively minor predators of owls compared to Eurasian eagle-owls and northern goshawks. The primary owls hunted by European eagles are Ural owls (Strix uralensis) and short-eared owls (Asio flammeus). Few eye-witness accounts are known of owl predation, but one violent mid-day confrontation between a golden eagle and an adult great horned owl was witnessed in Jefferson County, Colorado. Although this owl was about a third of the eagle's weight, it was able to land some damaging blows on the larger bird. In the end, despite its wounds, the eagle was victorious over the dead owl. A case of kleptoparasitism by a golden eagle on a great horned owl has been recorded. Although the Eurasian eagle-owl is preyed upon by golden eagles (4 confirmed cases of golden eagles killing eagle-owls in Europe), in one case a golden eagle (age unspecified) was found amongst the prey in an eagle-owl nest.

==== Relationships with other eagles ====
In the Palearctic, the golden eagle co-exists with several other large raptorial birds called eagles. Unlike in their relationship with smaller raptors, golden eagles are rarely reported to hunt other eagle species. Most conflicts between different eagles are over kills or carrion, though some species will defend nesting territories from each other. When it comes to carrion and kills, usually the "aggressor" (that is the eagle who initiates the agonistic behavior) is victorious over the other eagle. Considering that they overlap considerably in both distribution and prey selection, there is remarkably almost no known accounts from Eurasia of golden eagles behaving aggressively with other Aquila eagles. This is possibly due to segregated habitat preferences amongst these species, with lesser and greater spotted eagles being essentially woodland or wooded wetland-dwelling birds, Spanish and eastern imperial eagles inhabiting fragmented, open woods and steppe eagles generally living in flat, often treeless steppe and desert-like habitats. In central Asia, where golden eagles and other Aquila species are rare or absent, steppe eagles sometimes nest in mountainous rock formations like golden eagles. Compared to these eagles, the Bonelli's eagle appears to have a more contentious relationship with golden eagles, as they are often attracted to similar prey (largely rabbits and gamebirds) and occur in abutting habitats. The larger golden eagle is apparently dominant and, in at least one case, has killed and consumed a Bonelli's. The two species defend their territories from one another exclusively, in the same way they defend them from others of their own species. Both will use nests built by the other species, more so the golden using Bonelli's nests than vice versa. Further east, in Israel, Bonelli's and golden eagles are competitors as well. In the dry, barren Negev Desert, golden eagles nests were found 13 km (8.1 mi) apart and Bonelli's were scarce. In the Judaean Desert, which has more annual rainfall and more available prey, the distance between golden eagle nests averaged 16 km (9.9 mi) and the Bonelli's eagle easily outnumbered them. Apparently, the Bonelli's eagle exceptionally outcompeted its larger cousin here due to a subtle topographic variation in the habitat. Still, in areas without unnatural human pressures, the gradation between these species is still adequate enough that they can exist without serious negative effect on either population. In Japan, golden eagles were observed to hunt mountain hawk-eagles (Nisaetus nipalensis), despite the fact that the local race of hawk eagle is around the same mass as a Japanese golden eagle. The Bale Mountains of Ethiopia is arguably the richest biosphere the golden eagle is known to inhabit and there, this species may potentially interact with more than 10 other eagle species and nearly 30 other accipitrid species, including both migratory and resident breeding species. These are often supported by an exceptionally diverse, dense population of rodents there. The Bale Mountains golden eagles were recorded kleptoparatisizing steppe eagles, augur buzzard (Buteo augur), pallid harrier (Circus macrourus) and lanner falcons (Falco biarmicus) and the eagles were themselves kleptoparatisized by steppe eagles on three occasions. The golden eagles were also observed to chase tawny and steppe eagles out of their nesting territories. In the Bale Mountains, the golden eagle overlaps with perhaps its closest living relative, the Verreaux's eagle. The golden eagles appear to vigorously defend their territories from the Verreaux's eagles and, as in its relationship with the Bonelli's, the two species appear to maintain exclusive territories. Several chases involving the golden chasing Verreaux's were witnessed but only one where a Verreaux's chased off the golden. Despite several reported antagonistic interactions, no other raptors were found as prey in the Bale Mountains nests of golden eagles.

Perhaps the most formidable raptorial birds that the golden eagle co-exist with are the large northern Haliaeetus sea or fish eagles. Two species, the white-tailed eagle and the bald eagle, overlap in distribution frequently with golden eagles. Both are marginally heavier on average than the golden, especially the white-tailed eagle, which tends to have a slightly longer wingspan as well. There are many differences in the dietary biology of these species as they primarily eat fish, occasionally supplemented by water birds or other semi-aquatic prey, and obtain more of their food via scavenging of dead or injured animals or via kleptoparasitism than golden eagles do. They also prefer nesting in large trees by the shore of a body of water, often in lowland areas, quite different from the upland, often mountainous nesting habitat preferred by golden eagles. However, conflicts between the great eagles do occur, especially at carrion or kills. In most cases, the golden eagle is reportedly dominant over white-tailed eagles at food, reportedly being more aggressive and a more agile and swift flier. However, in some cases, white-tailed eagles have dominated golden eagles at carrion or kills. Competitions between golden and bald eagles in North America can reportedly go either way, depending on the size and disposition of the eagles involved. In Arizona, bald eagles were successful in 25% of attempts to rob golden eagles of their prey. Conflicts between white-tailed eagles and golden eagles over nesting sites occur with some frequency in some areas, but are unknown in other areas. In one instance in Norway, a pair of golden eagles harassed a newly formed pair of white-tailed eagles so persistently that the white-tails abandoned their nesting attempt. This relationship between the two eagle species is particularly aggressive in Scotland where the white-tailed eagle has been reintroduced recently. In the Scottish Highlands, a white-tailed eagle was found dead with talon piercings in its skull likely from a female golden eagle it had been interacting with the previous day. There are at least two known instances of Scottish white-tailed eagles fiercely attacking golden eagles in apparent territorial bouts, in one instance pulling the golden down into shallow coastal waters to drown. White-tailed eagles are able to survive on a great breadth of food and have longer guts so can live on less food for a longer time than golden eagles. Thus, the white-tailed may locally outcompete the golden eagle in terms of populating a given area. In North America, few such contentious relations have been reported between bald and golden eagles but golden eagles were reported to avoid the vicinity of active bald eagle nests. Even in areas where conflicts between white-tailed and golden eagles do occur it is thought that, since the species are very different in their preferred foods and nesting sites, they do not adversely affect the other at a population level. A much more passive interspecies guild of eagles have been observed in a wooded area of Kazakhstan, consisting of white-tailed, eastern imperial and golden eagle. This guild was seen to freely use abandoned nests built by the other two species. Unlike in Scotland and Norway (or in a guild of Buteos in the American Midwest), no aggression or conflicts were reported between the three large eagle species even though they sometimes nested within 475 m (1,558 ft) of one another. All observed conflicts in the Kazakhstani woods were amongst others of their own species. On the Scottish Isle of Mull, golden and white-tailed eagles also nested in close proximity without any observed aggressive encounters. The Steller's sea eagle co-exists with golden eagles in coastal Japan and Russia. This species is the heaviest living eagle and may weigh twice as much as the small-bodied Japanese golden eagles. Occasionally, both golden and white-tailed eagles join Steller's sea eagles to feed on fish caught along ice floes in the Sea of Okhotsk. The Steller's, being more aggressive in disposition than its bald and white-tailed cousins, appears dominant over golden eagles here and has been photographed repeatedly displacing them from fish. On the other hand, the Japanese golden eagle is no less aggressive than other golden eagles and, in at least one case, was videotaped dominating the bigger sea eagle in a fight over fish. The smaller Pallas's sea eagle (Haliaeetus leucoryphus) also overlaps in range with golden eagles but there is no published information on their relationship.

==== Relationships with carnivorous mammals ====
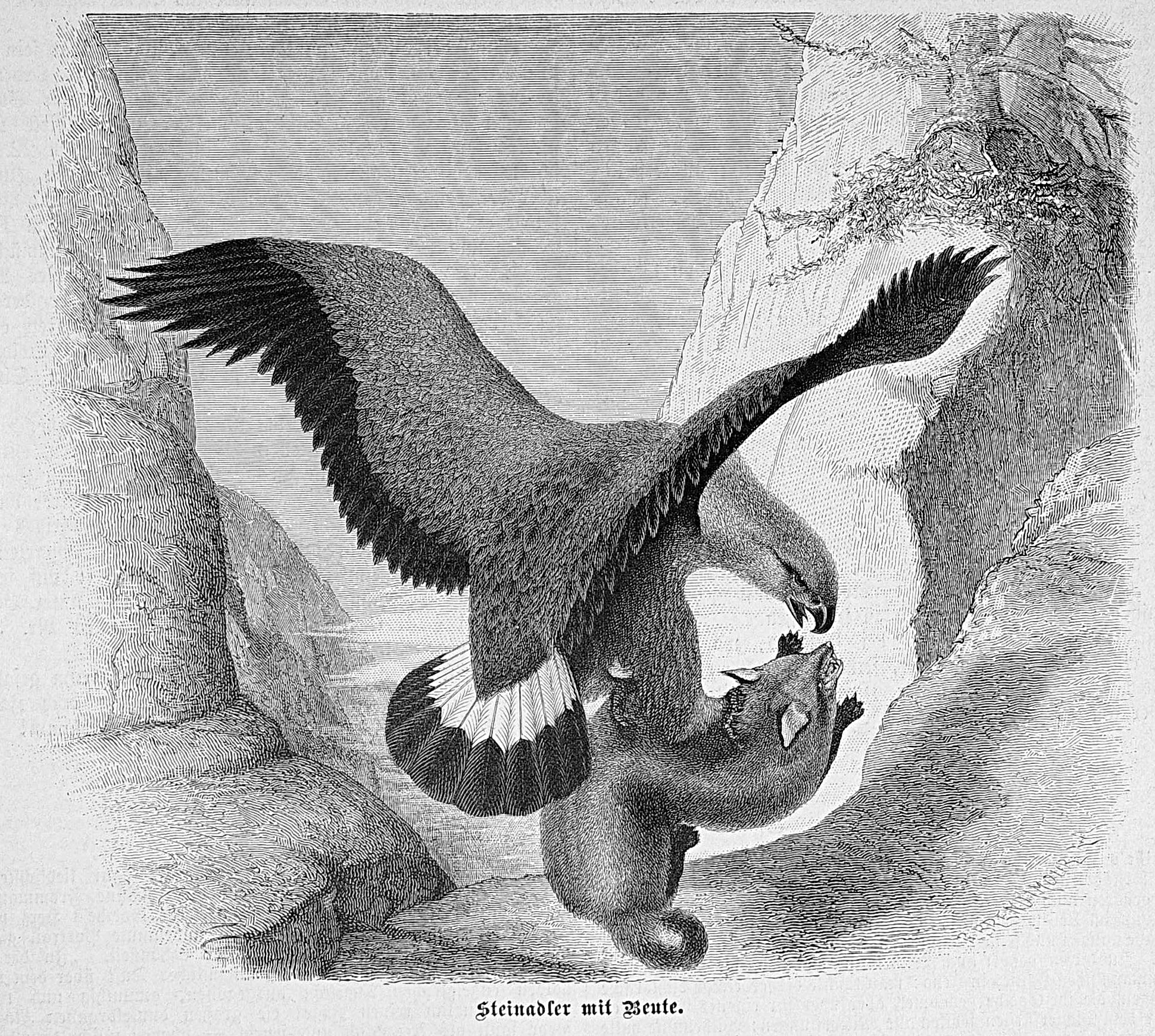
An inaccurately rendered but striking golden eagle in battle with a red fox

Mammalian carnivores are potential competitors with golden eagles for food. Foxes may prey on the same species in a given area but, as they are occasionally hunted by the eagles and are mainly nocturnal, they tend to avoid direct conflicts. Though rare, golden eagles may sometimes pirate prey from various species of fox. In North America, coyotes (Canis latrans) may engage in agonistic interactions with golden eagles. Despite being around three times as heavy, lone coyotes are seemingly dominated by golden eagles at many carrion or kill sites. In the Greater Yellowstone, golden eagles were ranked as the second most dominant scavenger at wolf kills during winter (when bears are hibernating) after coyote packs but above bald eagles. In one instance, a healthy adult male coyote was attacked and killed by a golden eagle. This coyote weighed 13.5 kg (30 lb) after the eagle had consumed some of its internal organs. Conflicts between golden eagles and Scottish wildcats have been reported on rare occasions. In one instance, a golden eagle trying to hunt some wildcat kittens was intercepted by the mother wildcat. In the ensuing violent battle, the wildcat mother and the eagle both died. In Northern California, golden eagles have pirated lambs killed by bobcats, a species which has itself occasionally turned up in the eagle's diet. Per one anecdote from the Himalayas, a golden eagle reportedly tried to predaceously attack a snow leopard (Panthera uncia) and was killed by the much larger felid, although this could have actually been a case of an overly bold eagle trying to displace a large predator from its own home range. Adult wolverines appear to be one of the few conspecific mammal carnivores to actively pose a threat to golden eagles. Wolverines were observed to prey on nestling golden eagles in Denali National Park. During incubation in Northern Sweden, an incubating adult golden eagle was killed on its nest by a wolverine. In Yellowstone National Park, one prey item amongst 473 recorded for cougars (Puma concolor) was a golden eagle, although no details of the attack or of the age of the bird were reported. Grizzly bears (Ursus arctos horribilis) have also reportedly killed and eaten golden eagle nestlings in Denali National Park. The grizzly is reportedly one of the few mammals to trigger a strong aggressive reaction from the parent eagles when spotted close to the nest, as eagles have been observed to strike the bruins about the head and neck with their talons.
