= Nasavrky (Ústí nad Orlicí District) =

- Municipality
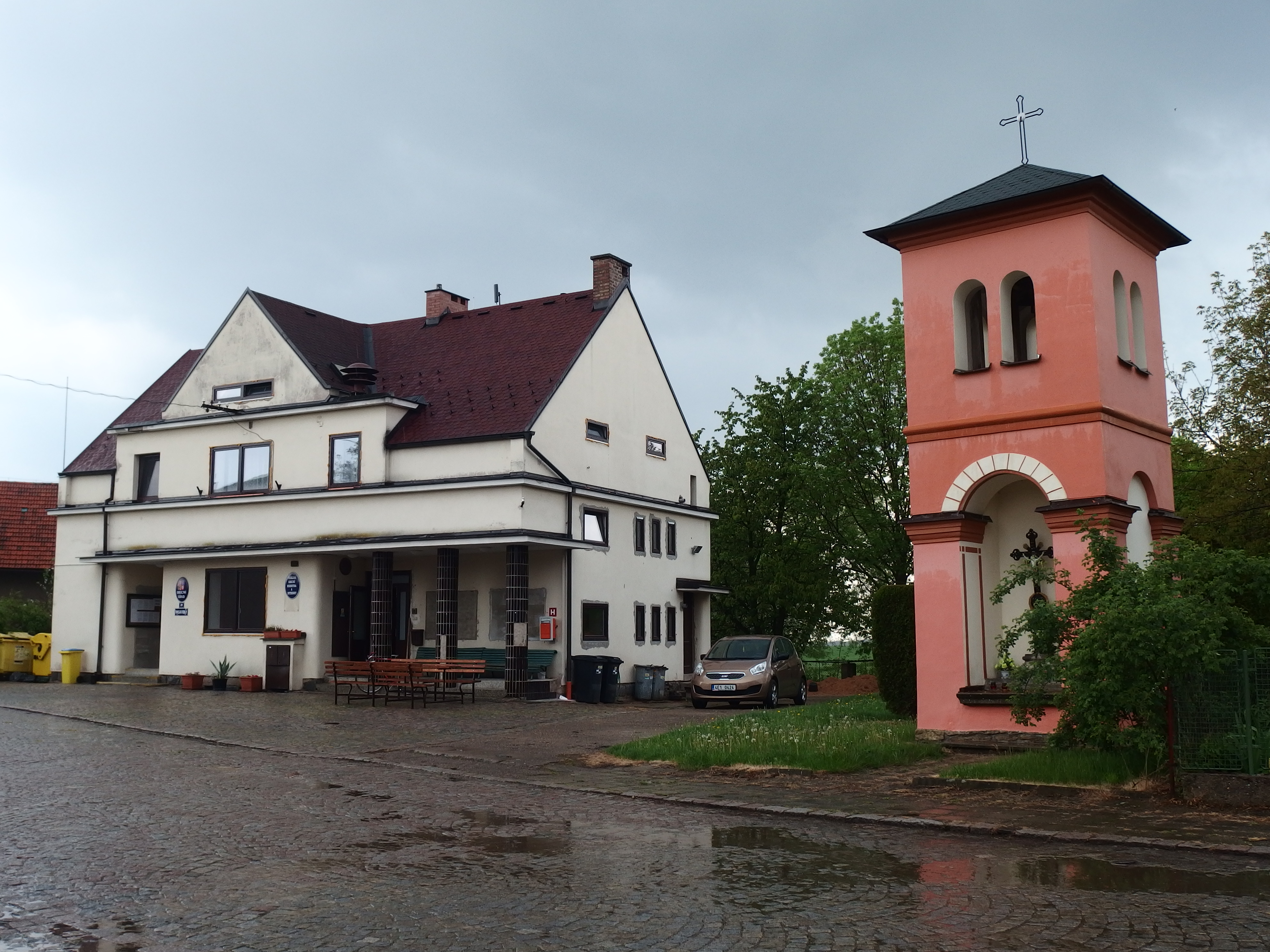
- Municipal office and belfry

- Location in the Czech Republic
- Coordinates: 50°1′32″N 16°15′33″E
- Country: Czech Republic
- Region: Pardubice
- District: Ústí nad Orlicí
- First mentioned: 1555

Area
  - Total: 1.33 km^{2} (0.51 sq mi)
- Elevation: 345 m (1,132 ft)

Population (2026-01-01)
  - Total: 146
  - Density: 110/km^{2} (284/sq mi)
- Time zone: UTC+1 (CET)
  - Summer (DST): UTC+2 (CEST)
- Postal code: 565 01
- Website: nasavrkyuo.cz

Nasavrky (German: Nasawrk) is a municipality and village in Ústí nad Orlicí District in the Pardubice Region of the Czech Republic. It has about 100 inhabitants.

Nasavrky lies approximately 12 kilometres (7 mi) north-west of Ústí nad Orlicí, 35 km (22 mi) east of Pardubice, and 132 km (82 mi) east of Prague.

== Demographics ==
Historical population
Year	Pop.	±%
1869	210	—
1880	243	+15.7%
1890	229	−5.8%
1900	212	−7.4%
1910	204	−3.8%
1921	189	−7.4%
1930	184	−2.6%
1950	145	−21.2%
1961	163	+12.4%
1970	169	+3.7%
1980	170	+0.6%
1991	148	−12.9%
2001	136	−8.1%
2011	136	+0.0%
2021	137	+0.7%
Source: Censuses
