= Nasavrky (Tábor District) =

- Municipality
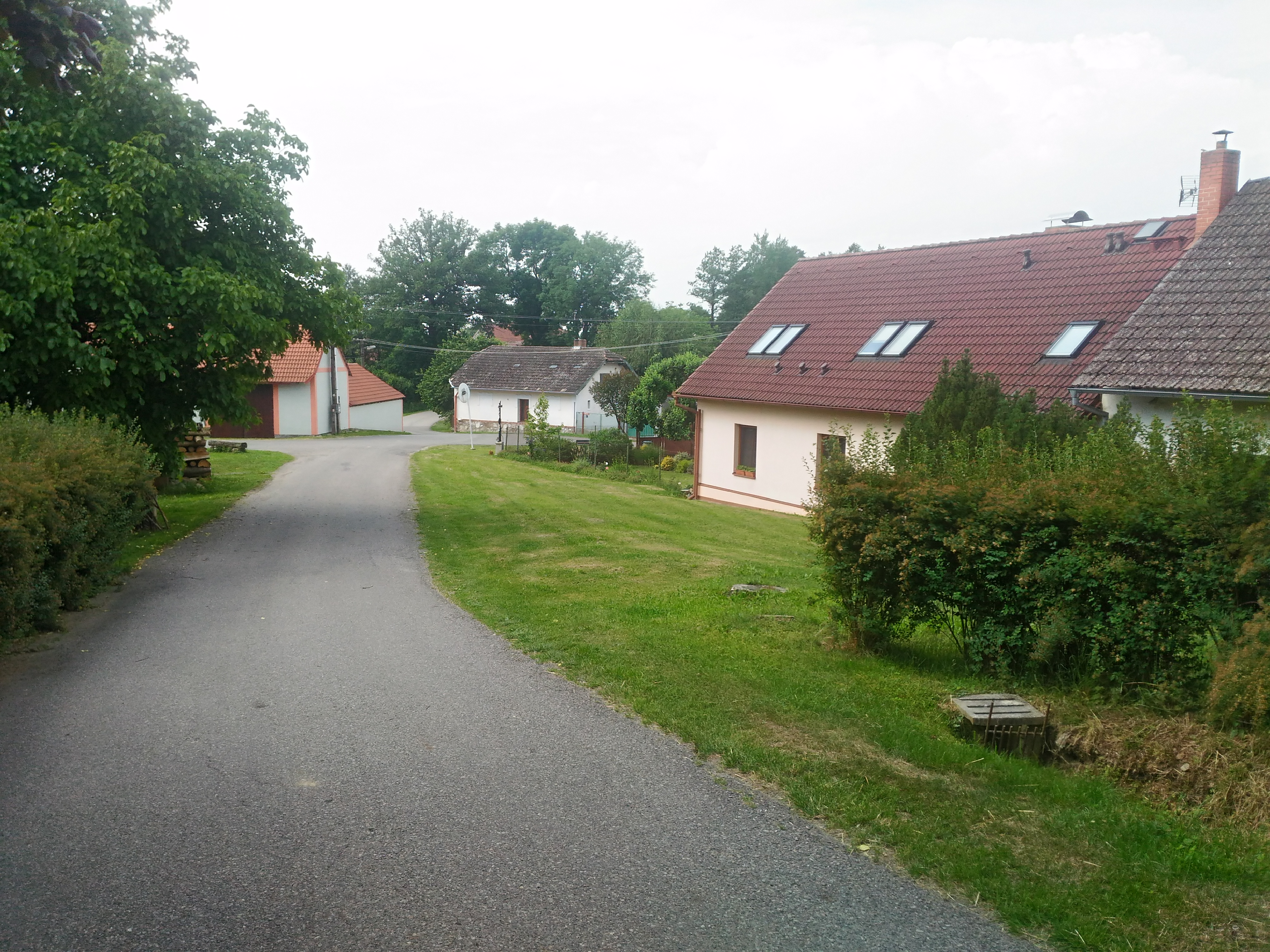
- A street in Nasavrky

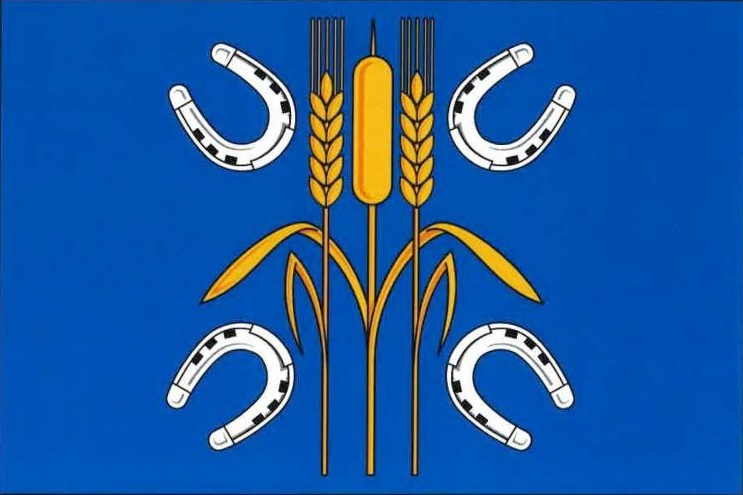
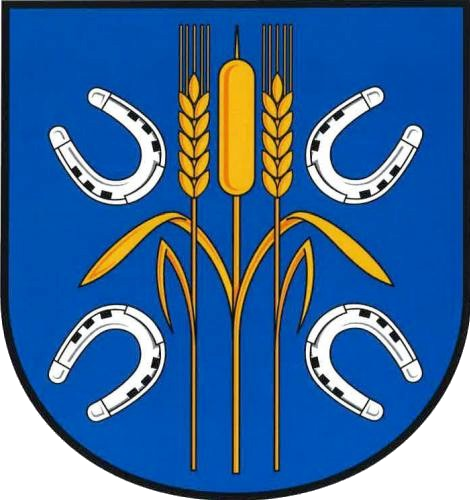
- Flag Coat of arms

- Location in the Czech Republic
- Coordinates: 49°27′7″N 14°38′26″E
- Country: Czech Republic
- Region: South Bohemian
- District: Tábor
- First mentioned: 1364

Area
  - Total: 1.46 km^{2} (0.56 sq mi)
- Elevation: 468 m (1,535 ft)

Population (2026-01-01)
  - Total: 92
  - Density: 63/km^{2} (160/sq mi)
- Time zone: UTC+1 (CET)
  - Summer (DST): UTC+2 (CEST)
- Postal code: 391 31
- Website: www.obec-nasavrky.cz

Nasavrky (German: Nasawerk) is a municipality and village in Tábor District in the South Bohemian Region of the Czech Republic. It has about 90 inhabitants.

Nasavrky lies approximately 5 kilometres (3 mi) north-west of Tábor, 55 km (34 mi) north of České Budějovice, and 73 km (45 mi) south of Prague.

== Demographics ==
Historical population
Year	Pop.	±%
1869	88	—
1880	103	+17.0%
1890	100	−2.9%
1900	91	−9.0%
1910	96	+5.5%
1921	98	+2.1%
1930	79	−19.4%
1950	84	+6.3%
1961	71	−15.5%
1970	53	−25.4%
1980	34	−35.8%
1991	25	−26.5%
2001	30	+20.0%
2011	88	+193.3%
2021	103	+17.0%
Source: Censuses
