= Raymond C. Moore Medal =

The Raymond C. Moore Medal for Paleontology is awarded by the Society for Sedimentary Geology to persons who have made significant contributions in the field which have promoted the science of stratigraphy by research in paleontology and evolution and the use of fossils for interpretations of paleoecology. The award is named after Professor Raymond C. Moore, the American paleontogist who helped to found the society.

== Prizewinners ==
Source: Society for Sedimentary Geology

- 2025 David Meyer
- 2024 Shuhai Xiao
- 2023 James MacEachern
- 2022 Luis Buatois
- 2021 Nigel Hughes
- 2020 Mary L. Droser
- 2019 Pamela Hallock
- 2018 William I. Ausich
- 2017 Susan Kidwell
- 2016 Anna K. Behrensmeyer
- 2015 Ann Budd
- 2014 David Bottjer
- 2013 Kenton Stewart Wall Campbell
- 2012 Carlton E. Brett
- 2011 Barun K. Sen Gupta
- 2010 Jere Lipps
- 2009 Leo Hickey
- 2008 Richard Fortey
- 2007 Ray Ethington
- 2006 Allison Palmer
- 2005 Andrew H. Knoll
- 2004 Isabella Primoli Silva
- 2003 George Pemberton
- 2002 Charles A. Ross
- 2001 David L. Clark
- 2000 William A. Berggren
- 1999 Stig M. Bergström
- 1998 Richard Bambach
- 1997 Alan H. Cheetham
- 1996 Alan B. Shaw
- 1995 N. Gary Lane
- 1994 Robert W. Frey
- 1993 Reuben J. Ross, Jr.
- 1992 Raymond C. Gutschick
- 1991 Erle Kauffman
- 1990 William A. Cobban
- 1989 Derek V. Ager
- 1988 Walter C. Sweet
- 1987 Alfred R. Loeblich Jr.
- 1986 Preston Cloud
- 1985 Arthur J. Boucot
- 1984 Helen T. Loeblich
- 1983 Adolf Seilacher
- 1982 Curt Teichert
- 1981 G. Arthur Cooper
- 1980 Norman D. Newell

== See also ==
- List of paleontology awards
- Prizes named after people
