= Norman D. Newell =

Paleontologist and curator (1909–2005)

- Born: January 27, 1909; Chicago, Illinois, U.S.
- Died: April 18, 2005 (aged 96); Leonia, New Jersey, U.S.
- Education: University of Kansas; Yale University
- Spouse(s): Valerie Zirkle (1928-1972); Gillian Wormall (1972-2005)
- Awards: Gold Medal for Achievement in Science
- Scientific career
- Fields: Invertebrate paleontology
- Workplaces: American Museum of Natural History; Columbia University
- Notable students: Niles Eldridge; Stephen Jay Gould

Norman Dennis Newell (January 27, 1909 – April 18, 2005) was an American professor of geology at Columbia University, and chairman and curator of invertebrate paleontology at the American Museum of Natural History in New York City.

== Early life and education ==
Newell was born on January 27, 1909 in Chicago, Illinois, to Virgil Bingham and Nellie Clark Newell. Shortly after he was born, his family moved to Stafford, Kansas. Newell's father, a dentist, died when he was 13, but had encouraged his early interest in geology from a young age, often taking him to fossil deposits in Kansas, and at Raymond Moore's suggestion, the Florissant Formation in Colorado.

Newell also had musical talents at an early age and won a state-wide clarinet competition. In 1926, he enrolled at the University of Kansas and studied closely under Raymond Moore, who took him on fossil collecting trips. To pay for tuition, he played the jazz saxophone in local bands. Newell graduated from Kansas with his B.S. in 1929 and his M.A. in 1931.

After Moore recommended him for a graduate fellowship, Newell began studying at Yale University, earning his doctorate in geology. At Yale, he specialized in bivalve mollusks and was mentored by paleontologists Charles Schuchert and Carl Owen Dunbar.

== Scientific career ==
Newell was an eminent paleontologist and systematist of Upper Paleozoic and Mesozoic bivalves. After graduating from Yale, he returned to the University of Kansas as a faculty member while simultaneously working under Raymond Moore at the Kansas Geological Survey. In 1937, Moore appointed Newell to attend the International Geological Congress held in the Soviet Union. His doctoral research on bivalve mollusks led to the publication of Late Paleozoic Pelecypods: Petinacea, which became a seminal text for introducing zoological concepts to the discipline of invertebrate paleontology. From 1939 to 1942, Newell was a coeditor of the Journal of Paleontology

That same year, Newell left Kansas and accepted a professorship at the University of Wisconsin, where he worked until 1942, when the U.S. Department of State enlisted him to survey the petroleum resources of Peru as well as the stratigraphy of Lake Titicaca.

In 1945, he began teaching geology and paleontology at Columbia University, where he would train future paleontologists Stephen Jay Gould, Niles Eldredge, Steven M. Stanley, Alan Cheetham, Alfred Fischer, and Don Boyd. Stephen Jay Gould remarked, "The work of graduate students is part of a mentor's reputation forever, because we trace intellectual lineages in this manner. I was Norman Newell's student, and everything that I ever do, as long as I live, will be read as his legacy."

He also joined the American Museum of Natural History as a curator in 1945, where he would remain until his retirement in 1977.

An important part of Newell's research was the study of mass extinctions on the history of life, publishing on the topic well before the Alvarez hypothesis made such theorizing respectable. In the 1940s and 1950s, he conducted considerable research on Permian reefs in West Texas, New Mexico, and the Bahamas. In the 1980s, Newell wrote on more publicly contentious topics, including a book in defense of Darwinian evolution over creationism and a paper in Palaios attributing mass extinctions to human-driven climate change.

In 1949, Newell served as the president of the Society for the Study of Evolution, the Paleontological Society in 1960 and 1961, and the Society of Systematic Zoology in 1973.

Newell was a member of the National Academy of Sciences, the American Association for the Advancement of Science, and the American Philosophical Society, and the American Academy of Arts and Sciences.

His numerous awards include accolades from Yale University, the American Geological Institute, and the American Museum of Natural History.

In 1994, the Norman D. Newell Fund was established at the American Museum of Natural History to support paleontological research. In 2004, he was named a Legendary Geoscientist by the American Geological Institute.

== Awards ==
- 1960: Mary Clark Thompson Medal, National Academy of Sciences
- 1961: Distinguished Service to Mankind Alumni Award, Kansas University
- 1965: Hayden Memorial Geological Award, Philadelphia Academy of Natural Sciences
- 1966: Verrill Medal, Peabody Museum
- 1977: Geological Society of Peru Medal
- 1978: American Museum of Natural History Gold Medal for Achievement in Science
- 1979: Paleontological Society Medal
- 1980: Raymond C. Moore Medal, the Society of Economic Paleontologists and Mineralogists
- 1987: Scientific Freedom and Responsibility Award, American Association for the Advancement of Science
- 1990: Penrose Medal, Geological Society of American
- 1996: Special Award, American Association of Petroleum Geologists

== Personal life and death ==
Newell was twice married. His first marriage was to Valerie Zirkle on February 25, 1928. Newell married Zirkle while an undergraduate at the University of Kansas. Valerie Zirkle died in 1972. His second marriage was to Gillian W. Wormall on April 28, 1973. Wormall was a co-worker of Newell's at the American Museum of Natural History in New York.

Newell died at his home in Leonia, New Jersey, on April 18, 2005, at the age of 96.

== Bibliography ==
- Newell, N. D. (1952). "Periodicity in invertebrate evolution." Journal of Paleontology 26 (May): 371-385.
- Newell, N. D. (1954). "Expedition to Raroia, Taumotus." Atol Research Bulletin 31 (Nov. 30): 1-109.
- Newell, N. D. (1959). "The Nature of the Fossil Record." Proceedings, American Philosophical Society 103 (2): 264-285.
- Newell, N. D. (1962). "Paleontological Gaps and Geochronology." Journal of Paleontology 36 (3): 592-610.
- Newell, N. D. (1963). "Crises in the History of Life." Scientific American 208 (2): 76-92.
- Newell, N. D. (1965). "Mass Extinctions at the End of the Cretaceous Period." Science 149 (27 August): 922-924.
- Newell, N. D. (1967). "Revolutions in the History of Life." In Uniformity and Simplicity. Boulder CO: Geology Society of America, pp. 63–91.
- Newell, N. D. and S. J. Gould, ed. (1980). Late Paleozoic Pelecypods: Pectinacea and Mytilacea. Salem, NH: Ayer Publishing.
- Newell, N. D. (1982). "Creation and Evolution: Myth or Reality." New York: Columbia University Press.
- Newell, N. D. (2001). "Half century later." In G.D. Stanley The History and Sedimentology of Ancient Reef Systems. New York: Springer Press, 205-216.
