= Stanley Awramik =

American biogeologist and paleontologist

- Education: Boston University (BA in geology); Harvard University (PhD)
- Known for: Work on stromatolites, hypothesis on the origin of life
- Scientific career
- Fields: Biogeology, sedimentology, microbiology
- Workplaces: Harvard University; University of California, Santa Barbara

Stanley Awramik (born 1946) is an American biogeologist and paleontologist. He is best known for his work related to the Precambrian. In 2013, he was inducted as a fellow of the Geological Society of America.

== Career ==
Born in New England, he first studied stromatolites as a graduate student under famed paleobotanist Elso Sterrenberg Barghoorn at Harvard University. In 1979, he became a faculty member at the University of California, Santa Barbara, where he was a contemporary of Preston Cloud.

=== Stromatolites ===
Awramik is known for his long standing expertise on stromatolites. His 1971 discovery of a link between a loss in stromatolitic diversity and the appearance of the first metazoans was published in Science. In 1974, he and Lynn Margulis gave an often-used definition of "stromatolite".

=== Origin of life ===
In 1983, he discovered what was then considered to be the oldest evidence of life on earth, located in Western Australia. His and others' work provided credence to the notion that life was likely as old as 3.5 Ga.

=== Recent research ===
Awramik remains a faculty member at UCSB, where he continues to teach. He continues to study stromatolites. Recently, he has begun studying Neoproterozoic deposits in eastern California. In 2003, he, Frank Corsetti and David Pierce published evidence in the Proceedings of the National Academy of Sciences of fossilized microbiota in Cryogenian rocks, a revelation which has cast doubt on the notion of the near elimination of life during potential equatorial glaciation during that period (commonly referred to as Snowball Earth).

== Selected works ==
=== Notable articles ===
- Awramik, S. M. (1971). "Precambrian Columnar Stromatolite Diversity: Reflection of Metazoan Appearance". Science. 174 (4011): 825–827. doi:10.1126/science.174.4011.825. PMID 17759393. S2CID 2302113.
- Corsetti, F. A.; Awramik, S. M.; Pierce, D. (2003). "A complex microbiota from snowball Earth times: Microfossils from the Neoproterozoic Kingston Peak Formation, Death Valley, USA". Proceedings of the National Academy of Sciences. 100 (8): 4399–404. doi:10.1073/pnas.0730560100. PMC 153566. PMID 12682298.
- Awramik, S. M.; Barghoorn, E. S. (1977). "The Gunflint microbiota". Precambrian Research. 5 (2): 121. doi:10.1016/0301-9268(77)90025-0.
- Awramik, S. M. (1992). "The oldest records of photosynthesis". Photosynthesis Research. 33 (2): 75–89. doi:10.1007/BF00039172. PMID 24408570.
- Awramik, S. M.; Schopf, J. W.; Walter, M. R. (1983). "Filamentous fossil bacteria from the Archean of Western Australia". Precambrian Research. 20 (2–4): 357. doi:10.1016/0301-9268(83)90081-5.

=== Other works ===
In addition to his journal articles, Awramik has written on a variety of topics related to biogeology. He co-authored a textbook on microbial sediments with Robert E. Riding, titled Microbial Sediments.

Additionally, he is interested in astrobiology, and has given several talks regarding the topic, including one titled "Astrobiology and the Origins of Life", at the National Health Museum in Atlanta.
