= Kay Behrensmeyer =

American taphonomist and paleoecologist

Anna K. Behrensmeyer
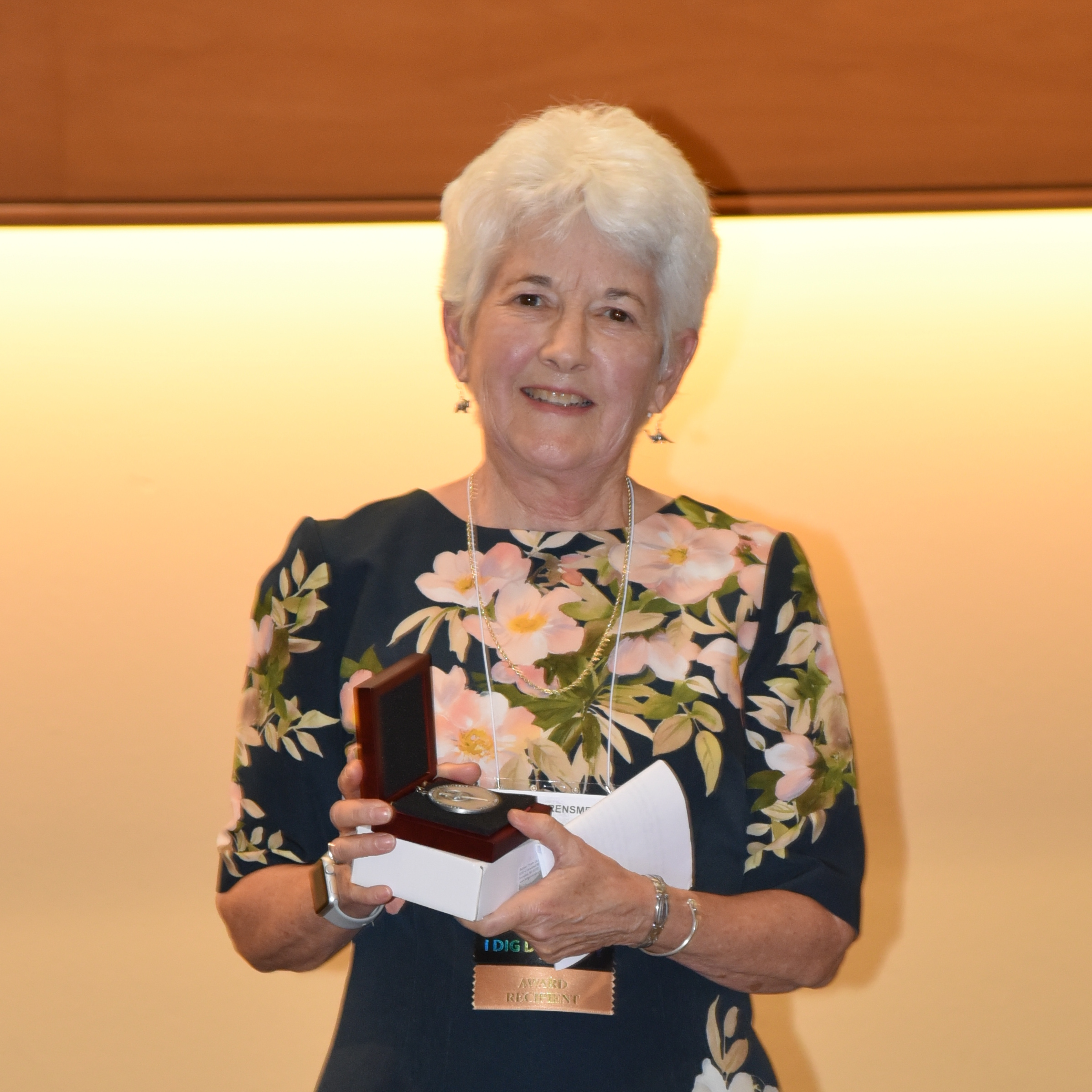
- Education: Washington University in St. Louis; Harvard University
- Spouse: William Keyser
- Children: Two
- Scientific career
- Fields: Taphonomy, paleoecology, paleontology
- Workplaces: National Museum of Natural History
- Thesis: The Taphonomy and Paleoecology of Plio-Pleistocene Vertebrate Assemblages East of Lake Rudolf, Kenya (1973)
- Doctoral advisor: Bryan Patterson

Anna Katherine "Kay" Behrensmeyer is an American taphonomist and paleoecologist. She is a pioneer in the study of the fossil records of terrestrial ecosystems and engages in geological and paleontological field research into the ecological context of human evolution in East Africa. She is Curator of Vertebrate Paleontology in the department of Paleobiology at the National Museum of Natural History (NMNH) of the Smithsonian Institution. At the museum, she is co-director of the Evolution of Terrestrial Ecosystems program and an associate of the Human Origins Program.

== Education and career ==
Behrensmeyer received her bachelor of arts degree from Washington University in St. Louis.

In 1968, Behrensmeyer made a detailed investigation of Lothagam, a Kenyan paleontological formation dating to the late Miocene-early Pliocene period. Within the succession, she identified six lithostratigraphic units. She later compiled a chart for the 400 fossil specimens collected in 1967 and published a faunal list for Lothagam 3 in 1976.

While she was a graduate student at Harvard in 1969, Behrensmeyer was invited by paleoanthropologist Richard Leakey to be his team geologist and to map fossil deposits at Koobi Fora in Kenya. She discovered a cluster of stone tools eroding out of a volcanic tuff, an ash layer from an ancient eruption that filled a small paleochannel. The site was named in her honor and the layer was named the Kay Behrensmeyer Site Tuff or KBS Tuff. The tools were similar to those discovered by Mary Leakey at Olduvai Gorge. The radiometric dating used by the team indicated that the fossils were 2.6 million years old. The dating of the site was controversial, as it contradicted other paleobiological evidence. A later independent investigation revised the date to 1.9 mya.

Behrensmeyer received her Ph.D. the in vertebrate paleontology and sedimentology from Harvard University department of Geological Sciences in 1973. Her dissertation, published in 1975, showed that the composition of the fossil vertebrate faunas of East Turkana, Kenya, varied with sedimentary environment (channel, floodplain, lake margin), and this provided new information on the taphonomy and paleoecology of hominin-bearing, Plio-Pleistocene sediments .

She held post-doctoral positions at UC Berkeley and Yale and taught for the UC Santa Cruz Earth Science Board before beginning her career at the Smithsonian Institution in 1981. Since 1986, she has led research on the geological context of Olorgesailie.

Since 1987, Behrensmeyer has been the co-director of Evolution of Terrestrial Ecosystems Program at the National Museum of Natural History. From 1993 to 1996, she served as Acting Associate Director for Science at NMNH. She has served as associate editor for the Paleobiology, PALAIOS, and Palaeoclimates journals. From 1985 to 1987, she was on the board of associate editors for the Journal of Human Evolution. She is also an adjunct professor at the University of Arizona and George Washington University.

VOA report with Behrensmeyer interviewed at the Smithsonian

Aside from Behrensmeyer's research into the paleoecology and taphonomy of hominid-bearing deposits in the Olorgesailie basin, Baringo basin and East Turkana, she has conducted a long-term study of the taphonomy of modern vertebrate remains in the Amboseli National Park in Kenya, that began in 1975, in collaboration with ecologist David Western. The study involves a census of live animals and carcasses every five to ten years. The study suggests that fossil animal assemblages in tropical settings may be used to make inferences about ancient habitats when post-depositional taphonomic biases are accounted for. At a field area in Kenya known as Koobi Fora where work by Behrensmeyer had begun in 1978, field work in 2026 by her and other anthropologists has opened the possibility of a better understanding of the physical size of a hominid for whom records are scarce.

Her other projects include field exploration and analysis of Upper Triassic – Lower Jurassic vertebrate taphonomy and paleoecology in Arizona and paleoecological research in the Miocene Pakistan Siwalik sequence. Behrensmeyer also is compiling a taphonomic reference collection of bones and fossils at the National Museum of Natural History.

She was named one of the "50 Most Important Women Scientists" by Discover magazine in 2002.

== Honors and awards ==
- 2016: Raymond C. Moore Medal of the Society for Sedimentary Geology
- 2018: Romer-Simpson Medal of the Society of Vertebrate Paleontology
- 2018: Paleontological Society Medal
- 2019: G. K. Warren Prize
- 2020: Elected Member of the National Academy of Sciences

== Selected publications ==
Behrensmeyer has published over 130 scientific articles.

- Behrensmeyer, A. K. (1970) "New hominid remains and early artefacts from northern Kenya: Preliminary geological interpretation of a new hominid site in the Lake Rudolf Basin." Nature 226 (5242):225–226. doi:10.1038/226225a0
- Isaac, G., Leakey, R., Behrensmeyer, A. (1971) "Archeological traces of early hominid activities east of Lake Rudolf, Kenya." Science 173:1129–1134. doi:10.1126/science.173.4002.1129
- Behrensmeyer, A. K. (1975) "The Taphonomy and Paleoecology of Plio-Pleistocene Vertebrate Assemblages East of Lake Rudolf, Kenya." Bulletin MCZ 145 (10):473–574. (Ph.D. Dissertation)
- Behrensmeyer, A. K. (1978) "The habitat of Plio-Pleistocene hominids in East Africa: taphonomic and microstratigraphic guidance." In: C. Jolly (ed.), Early Hominids of Africa (Duckworth: London), pp. 165–189. LCCN 79-303675 ISBN 0715609289
- Behrensmeyer, A. K., Hill A. (Editors). (1980) Fossils in the Making: Vertebrate Paleoecology and Taphonomy (Chicago: University of Chicago Press). 338 pp. LCCN 79-19879; hbk ISBN 0226041697; pbk ISBN 0226041689; Behrensmeyer, Anna K.; Hill, Andrew P. (15 February 1988). 1988 pbk reprint. University of Chicago Press. ISBN 978-0-226-04153-7.
- Behrensmeyer, A. K., Laporte, L. F. (1981) "Footprints of a Pleistocene Hominid in Northern Kenya." Nature 289: 167–169.doi:10.1038/289167a0
- Behrensmeyer, A. K. (1985) "Taphonomy and the paleoecologic reconstruction of hominid habitats in the Koobi Fora Formation." In: Coppens, Y., Ed., L'environment des hominides au Plio-Pleistocene. (Paris: Foundation Singer-Polignac). pp. 309–324.
- Behrensmeyer, A. K., Gordon, K. D., Yanagi, G. T. (1986) "Trampling as a cause of bone surface damage and pseudo-cutmarks." Nature 319:768–771. doi:10.1038/319768a0
- Behrensmeyer, A. K. (1991) "Terrestrial Vertebrate Accumulations." pp. 291–335 in Allison, P. and Briggs, D. E. G. Taphonomy: Releasing the Data Locked in the Fossil Record. New York: Plenum. LCCN 91-29242 ISBN 0306438763
- Behrensmeyer, A. K., Hook, R. W. (1992) Chapter 2. "Paleoenvironmental contexts and taphonomic modes" (in the terrestrial fossil record). In: Behrensmeyer, A. K., Damuth, J. D., DiMichele, W. A., Potts, R., Sues, H.-D., Wing, S. L., Eds. Terrestrial Ecosystems Through Time, pp. 15–136. (Chicago: University of Chicago Press). xx+568 pages, pbk. ISBN 0-226-04155-7. Based on a conference, Washington, D.C., 1987.
- Behrensmeyer, A. K., Potts, R., Plummer, T., Tauxe, L., Opdyke, N., Jorstad, T. (1995) "Stratigraphy, chronology, and paleoenvironments of the Pleistocene locality of Kanjera, western Kenya." Journal of Human Evolution 29: 247–274.
- Isaac, G. L., Behrensmeyer, A. K. (1997) "Chapter 2: Geological Context and Paleoenvironments." pp. 12–53. In: Koobi Fora Research Project Volume 5: Plio-Pleistocene Archaeology. Glynn L. Isaac and B. Isaac, Eds. Oxford: Clarendon Press. 556 pp.
- Behrensmeyer, A. K., Todd, N. E., Potts, R., McBrinn, G. E. (1997) "Late Pliocene faunal turnover in the Turkana Basin, Kenya and Ethiopia." Science 278:1589–1594. doi:10.1126/science.278.5343.1589
- Potts, R., Behrensmeyer, A. K., Ditchfield, P. (1999) "Paleolandscape variation and early Pleistocene hominid activities: Members 1 and 7, Olorgesailie Formation." Journal of Human Evolution 37:747–788.
- Behrensmeyer, A. K., Potts, R., Deino, A., Ditchfield, P. (2002) "Olorgesailie, Kenya: A million years in the life of a rift basin." Sedimentation in Continental Rifts, Renaut, R. W. and Ashley, G. M, Eds.) SEPM Special Publication 73: 97–106.
- Bobe, René, Behrensmeyer, A. K. (2004) "The expansion of grassland ecosystems in Africa in relation to mammalian evolution and the origin of the genus Homo." Palaeogeography, Palaeoclimatology, Palaeoecology 207: 399–420.
- Potts, R., Behrensmeyer, A. K., Deino, A., Ditchfield, P., Clark, J. (2004) "Small mid-Pleistocene hominin associated with East African Acheulean technology." Science 305: 75–78. doi:10.1126/science.1097661
- Behrensmeyer, A. K. (2006) "Climate change and human evolution." Science 311:476–478. doi:10.1126/science.1116051
- Behrensmeyer, A. K. (2008) "Paleoenvironmental context of the Pliocene A.L. 333 “First Family” Hominin Locality, Denen Dora Member, Hadar Formation, Ethiopia." GSA Special Paper 446: The Geology of Early Humans in the Horn of Africa, edited by Jay Quade and Jonathan Wynn, pp. 203–214.
- Western, D., Behrensmeyer, A. K. (2009) "Bone assemblages track community structure over 40 years in an African savanna system." Science 324: 1061–1064. doi:10.1126/science.1171155
