= Arthur James Boucot =

American paleontologist

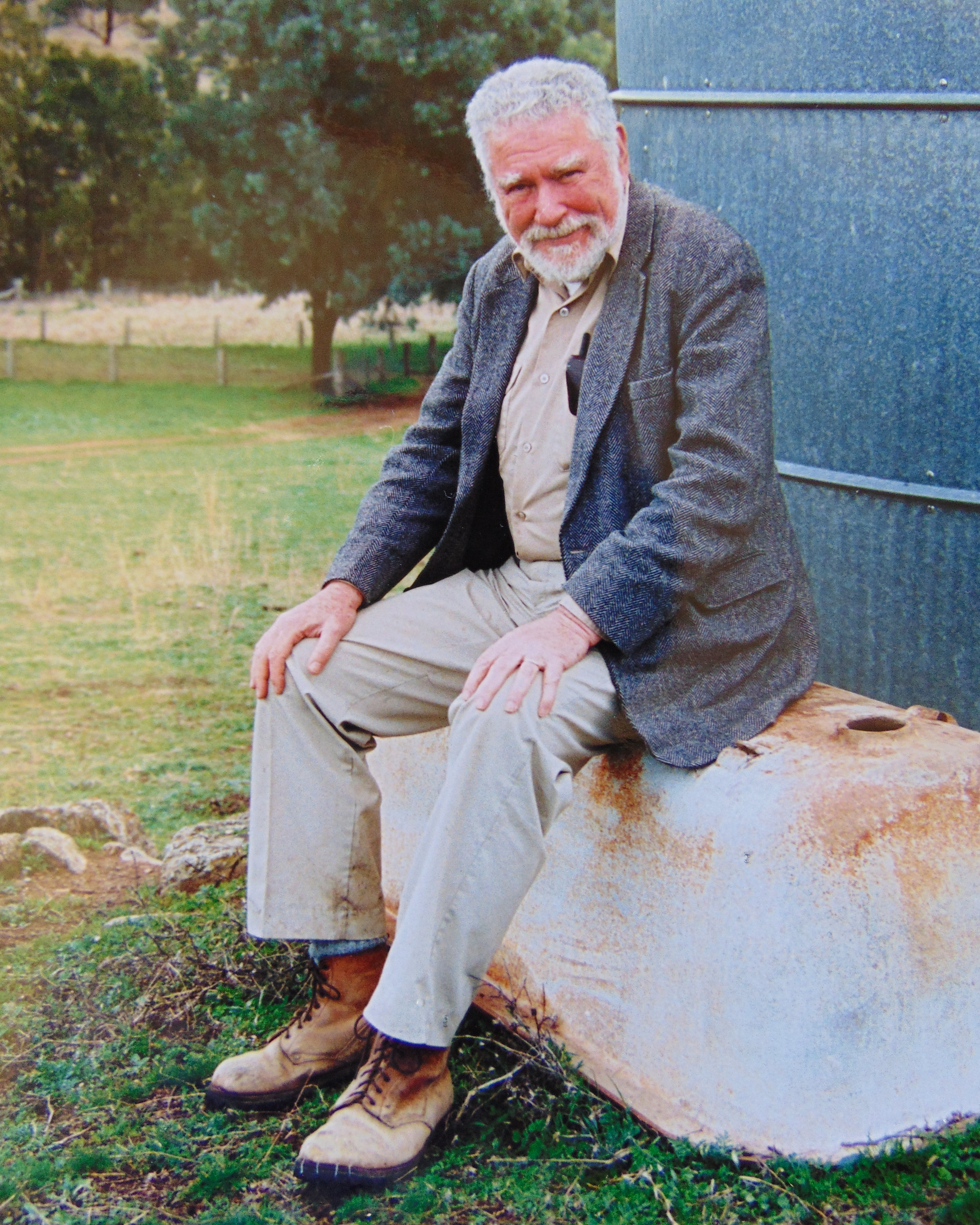
- Art Boucot in Australia, 2001
- Born: 26 May 1924
- Died: 10 April 2017 (aged 92)
- Scientific career
- Fields: Paleontology

Arthur James Boucot (May 26, 1924, Philadelphia, Pennsylvania, to 10 April 2017, Denver, Colorado) was an American paleontologist, biostratigrapher, and taphonomist who was an expert in Silurian and Devonian marine invertebrates, particularly brachiopods.

== Early life ==
Boucot was born in Philadelphia, and raised in an academic family with early exposure to geology and paleontology. He began his studies at the University of Pennsylvania but dropped out in his freshman year to work at RCA. He was drafted into the United States Army during WWII, but enlisted in the United States Army Air Forces as a navigator with the Eighth Air Force on B-24 Bombers, and was awarded the Distinguished Flying Cross.

== Education and academic career ==
Boucot obtained his geology degrees from Harvard University with a B.S. in 1948, an MS in 1949, and a PhD in 1953. Although he began his geological studies focused on mineralogy and petrography, his interest in paleontology was sparked at Harvard by assistant professor Preston Cloud, and expert on the Cambrian Explosion. Boucot's dissertation was on the biostratigraphy of the Devonian Moose River Basin where it crops out in Maine. From 1951 until 1956 he worked at the United States Geological Survey where Cloud was Chief of Paleontology and Stratigraphy. At the USGS he did work with James Brookes Knight, an expert in Paleozoic gastropods and G. Arthur Cooper, a leading expert in extant and fossil brachiopods. Boucot left the USGS when he was awarded a Guggenheim fellowship for studies in Europe collecting Silurian and Devonian fossils in Western Europe. In 1957 he began his academic professional career at the Massachusetts Institute of Technology. From 1961 to 1968 he taught at Caltech, then spent a year jointly at the University of Pennsylvania and the Smithsonian Institution, which houses many of his early letters and papers. In 1969 he began his lengthy career as a professor of geology and, eventually, integrative biology, at Oregon State University.

== Specializations ==
Boucot's major publications focus on both North American and global taxonomic studies of Silurian-Devonian invertebrates, primarily brachiopods. In North America Boucot worked largely in New England to publish on the taxonomy of middle Paleozoic brachiopods and create a biogratigraphy of Eastern North American brachiopods. His global field work, including work in Western Europe, Antarctica, and eastern Canada developed large scale taxonomies of Silurian-Devonian brachiopods. His later work, based on collaborative international field work, included publications on paleoecology of middle Paleozoic brachiopods.

== Awards and honors ==
In 1985, he was awarded the Raymond C. Moore Medal for Paleontology, and in 1999 the Paleontological Society Medal. He has served as president of the Paleontological Society in 1980–1981, and president of the International Palaeontological Association from 1984–1989, and Vice-President of the International Commission on Stratigraphy from 1986–1989. The Boucot Plateau of the Geologists Range of Antarctica was named by the Advisory Committee on Antarctic Names for Arthur J. Boucot to honor his research for United States Antarctic Program at Byrd Station and the Horlick Mountains in 1964-65.

== Books ==
- Arthur J. Boucot (1975), Evolution and extinction rate controls, Elsevier, ISBN 978-0-444-41182-2
- Jane Gray; Arthur James Boucot, eds. (1979), Historical biogeography, plate tectonics, and the changing environment: proceedings of the thirty-seventh Annual Biology Colloquium, and selected papers, Oregon State University Press, ISBN 978-0-870-71176-3
- Arthur James Boucot (1981), Principles of Benthic Marine Paleoecology, Academic Press, ISBN 978-0-121-18980-8
- Arthur J. Boucot & George O. Poinar Jr. (2010), Fossil Behavior Compendium, CRC Press, ISBN 978-1-439-81058-3
- Arthur J. Boucot (2013), Evolutionary Paleobiology of Behavior and Coevolution, Elsevier Science, ISBN 978-1-483-29081-2
