= Nigel Hughes =

British-American paleontologist

Nigel Charles Hughes (born 25 March 1964) is a British-American paleontologist. He is Professor of Earth Sciences at the University of California, Riverside.

Hughes graduated in Geology at the University of Durham (1985) and completed a PhD at the University of Bristol (1990).

He received the 2021 Raymond C. Moore Medal from the Society for Sedimentary Geology. He is the spouse of fellow paleontologist Mary L. Droser.
