= Hayden Memorial Geological Award =

The Hayden Memorial Geological Award is presented by the Academy of Natural Sciences of Drexel University (formerly the Academy of Natural Sciences of Philadelphia), Philadelphia, Pennsylvania, USA. It was named after US geologist Ferdinand Vandeveer Hayden. The award was established in 1888 and first awarded in 1890.

== Laureates ==
- 1890 — James Hall
- 1891 — Edward D. Cope
- 1892 — Eduard Suess
- 1893 — Thomas H. Huxley
- 1894 — Gabriel Auguste Daubrée
- 1895 — Karl A. von Zittel
- 1896 — Giovanni Capellini
- 1897 — A. Karpinski
- 1898 — Otto Torell
- 1899 — Gilles Joseph Gustave Dewalque
- 1902 — Archibald Geikie
- 1905 — Charles Doolittle Walcott
- 1908 — John Mason Clarke
- 1911 — John C. Branner
- 1914 — Henry Fairfield Osborn
- 1917 — William Morris Davis
- 1920 — Thomas Chrowder Chamberlin
- 1923 — Alfred Lacroix
- 1926 — William B. Scott
- 1929 — Charles Schuchert
- 1932 — Reginald A. Daly
- 1935 — Andrew C. Lawson
- 1938 — Arthur Smith Woodward
- 1941 — Amadeus W. Grabau
- 1944 — Joseph A. Cushman
- 1947 — Paul Niggli
- 1950 — George Gaylord Simpson
- 1953 — Norman L. Bowen
- 1956 — Raymond C. Moore
- 1959 — Carl O. Dunbar
- 1962 — Alfred S. Romer
- 1965 — Norman D. Newell
- 1968 — Elso S. Barghoorn
- 1971 — Wilmot Hyde Bradley
- 1979 — Daniel I. Axelrod
- 1982 — Stephen Jay Gould
- 1986 — John Ostrom
- 1997 — Edwin Colbert
- 2007 — Edward B. Daeschler

== See also ==
- List of geology awards
- Prizes named after people
