= Martin Brasier =

British paleontologist (1947–2014)

Martin David Brasier
- Born: 12 April 1947; Wimbledon, London, England
- Died: 16 December 2014 (aged 67); Burford, Oxfordshire, England
- Education: University of London; University of Oxford
- Scientific career
- Fields: Palaeontology; Evolutionary biology; Micropaleontology; Astrobiology
- Workplaces: British Geological Survey; University of Reading; University of Hull; Memorial University of Newfoundland; University of Oxford

Martin David Brasier FGS FLS (12 April 1947 – 16 December 2014) was an English palaeobiologist and astrobiologist known for his conceptual analysis of microfossils and evolution in the Precambrian and Cambrian.

He was Professor of Palaeobiology at the University of Oxford and Emeritus Fellow of St Edmund Hall. His research critically examined the context and character of the early fossil record, making use of field mapping, logging, optical petrography, stable isotope geochemistry, confocal microscopy, NanoSims microprobes, and lasers for high resolution 3D scanning and laser Raman spectroscopy.

== Biography ==
Brasier was born in Wimbledon, London, England. He studied at University of Oxford. He completed a master's degree in geology from Chelsea College, London (at the time a part of the University of London). In 1969, he enrolled for doctoral course under the supervision of Tom Barnard the University College London. During 1969 and 1970, he worked as a naturalist on board the Royal Navy hydrographic survey ships HMS Fawn and HMS Fox. His duty was mapping the distribution of small algae, protists and marine plants in the Caribbean. The fossils he observed there became an inspiration in palaeontology and evolution, as he remarked, "I could see that it is the analysis of interconnections between and within systems that may provide a valuable key for decoding the early history of life." In 1973, he earned his PhD on the study of Caribbean specimens and ecology from the University College London.

Soon after he received a doctorate, Brasier worked at the British Geological Survey. Before long he was appointed a lecturer at the University of Reading where he worked for one year. In 1974, he moved to the University of Hull. In 1988, he transferred to the University of Oxford as a lecturer in geology under the Department of Life Sciences. Simultaneously he was given a tutorial fellowship at St Edmund Hall. In 1996, he became a reader in earth sciences and, in 2002, a full professor of palaeobiology. Between 2007 and 2013, he was an Adjunct Professor in the Department of Earth Sciences at the Memorial University of Newfoundland, Canada. He retired from Oxford in September 2014.

Brasier died in a car accident near Burford, Oxfordshire, UK, on 16 December 2014. He was survived by his wife, Cecilia, and a daughter and two sons.

== Contributions ==
Brasier's contributions include the Brasier–Schopf debate on critical testing of questionable 3460 Ma Apex chert 'microfossils' at NASA; work on the earliest well-preserved fossils of cells (biology) (3430 Ma Strelley Pool); the pumice hypothesis for the origins of life; mapping the earliest life on land (1000 Ma Torridonian); and the palaeoecology, development and evolution of Ediacaran to early Cambrian organisms. He was secretary and then leader of the International Geoscience Programme, UNESCO and International Commission on Stratigraphy Projects on the Precambrian-Cambrian Boundary decision. This defined the base of the Phanerozoic Eon, Palaeozoic Era and Cambrian Period at a section in Newfoundland and Labrador based upon the appearance of the first assemblage of vertical burrowing animal trace fossils, Treptichnus pedum.

The same datum defines the top of the Precambrian and of the Proterozoic Eon. His own book on the subject, Darwin's Lost World was published in 2009 as part of the Charles Darwin centenary celebrations. His sequel, called Secret Chambers, goes in search of the symbiotic origins of the eukaryote chloroplast, tracing its evolution through the last two billion years, exploring the ideas of Robert Hooke, Elso Barghoorn, Tom Cavalier-Smith and Lynn Margulis, and delving into the interval that Brasier dubbed 'the Boring Billion'.

== Award and recognition ==
- Lyell Medal, Geological Society of London, Burlington House, 2014 (for his research of early life)
- Society of Biology first book awards nomination 2013 (for Secret Chambers)

== Selected publications ==
- Landing, E., Geyer, G., Brasier, M.D., and Bowring, S. A. 2013. Cambrian evolutionary radiation: context, correlation, and chronostratigraphy—overcoming deficiencies of the first appearance datum (FAD) concept. Earth-Science Reviews (journal),123. 133-172
- Brasier, M.D., Matthewman, R., McMahon, S. and Wacey, D. 2011. Pumice as a remarkable substrate for the origins of life. Astrobiology, 7, 725-735
- Wacey, D., Kilburn, M., Saunders, M., Cliff, J. and Brasier, M.D. 2011. Microfossils of sulphur-metabolizing cells in 3.4-billion-year-old rocks of Western Australia. Nature Geoscience, 4, 698-702
- Strother, P.K., Battison, L., Brasier, M.D. & Wellman, C.H. 2011. Earth's earliest non-marine eukaryotes. Nature. 403, 505-509
- Brasier, M.D. & Antcliffe, J.B. 2009. Evolutionary relationships within the Avalonian Ediacara biota: new insights from Laser Analysis. Journal of the Geological Society, 166, 363-384
- Brasier, M.D. & Antcliffe, J. 2004. Decoding the Ediacaran Enigma. Science 305, 1115-1117
- Brasier, M.D., Green, O.R., Jephcoat, A.P., Kleppe, A.K., Van Kranendonk, M.J., Lindsay, J.F., Steele, A. & Grassineau, N.V. 2002. Questioning the evidence for Earth's oldest fossils. Nature 416, 76-81
- Brasier, M.D. & Lindsay, J.F. 1998. A billion years of environmental stability and the emergence of eukaryotes. New data from northern Australia. Geology, 26, 555-558
- Brasier, M.D., Cowie, J.W. & Taylor, M.E. 1994. Decision on the Precambrian- Cambrian boundary stratotype. Episodes, 17, 3–8.
- Brasier, M.D. 1979. The Cambrian radiation event. In House, M.R. (ed.) 'The Origin of Major Invertebrate Groups'. Systematics Association Special Volume, 12, 103-159

== Books ==
- Brasier, M.D. 2012. Secret Chambers: the inside story of cells and complex life. Oxford University Press, 298pp.
- Brasier, M.D. 2009. Darwin's Lost World: the hidden history of animal life. Oxford University Press, 322pp., ISBN 978-0-19954-897-2
- Cowie, J.W. and Brasier, M.D. 1989. The Precambrian-Cambrian Boundary, Oxford Monographs in Geology and Geophysics, No. 12.
- Brasier, MD. 1980. Microfossils. George Allen & Unwin, London, 193pp.
