= Preston Cloud =

American scientist (1912 – 1991)

- Born: Preston Ercelle Cloud, Jr; September 26, 1912; West Upton, Massachusetts, US
- Died: January 16, 1991 (aged 78); Santa Barbara, California
- Education: George Washington University (BSc); Yale University (PhD)
- Known for: Geologic time scale Origin of life Cambrian explosion
- Awards: Paleontological Society Medal (1971); Lucius Wilbur Cross Medal (1973); Penrose Medal (1976); Charles Doolittle Walcott Medal (1977)
- Scientific career
- Fields: Biogeology, Physical cosmology
- Workplaces: Harvard University, University of California, Santa Barbara
- Doctoral advisor: C. O. Dunbar

Preston Ercelle Cloud, Jr. (September 26, 1912 – January 16, 1991) was an American earth scientist, biogeologist, cosmologist, and paleontologist. He served in the United States Navy (in which he was a bantamweight boxing champion), and led several field explorations of the U.S. Geological Survey. In academia, he was a member of the faculty of Harvard University, University of Minnesota, University of California, Los Angeles, and lastly University of California, Santa Barbara. He was best known for his work on the geologic time scale and the origin of life on Earth, and as a pioneering ecologist and environmentalist. His works on the significance of Cambrian fossils in the 1940s led to the development of the concept "Cambrian explosion," for which he coined the phrase "eruptive evolution." His work from the 1960's through the 1970's on the significance of certain mineralogical differences between sedimentary rocks laid down before and after about 2.5Ga (2.5 billion years ago), as well as the timing of the worldwide deposits of Banded Iron Formations (BIF) compared with that of continental red beds, led him to propose the now well-accepted concept of a turning point in Earth's history (now known as the Great Oxidation Event or GOE) in the beginning of the Proterozoic eon, during which Earth's oceans and atmosphere first became enriched in O_{2} (molecular oxygen), allowing the later emergence and radiation of complex multicellular life.

== Early life and education ==
Cloud was born in West Upton, Massachusetts. He was the third of seven children of Preston Ercelle and Pauline L. (née Wiedemann) Cloud. His father was an engineer-draftsman, and his mother, a genealogist. He grew up in Waynesboro, Pennsylvania, where he developed a love for the outdoors. He enjoyed Scouting and was an Eagle Scout. Upon graduating from Waynesboro High School in 1929, Cloud spent three years in the United States Navy (1930–1933) where he excelled at boxing. He was the bantamweight champion of the Pacific Fleet Scouting Force. Due to the Great Depression, he could not join university, and attended night school at George Washington University, so that he could self-support by doing odd jobs during daytime. Ray S. Bassler, his geology professor and Curator of Geology at the U.S. National Museum, helped him to get manual jobs in the museum. Because of his keen interest in paleontology, he was given a job as a preparator in the paleontology laboratory under G. Arthur Cooper. It was Cooper who guided him to have his first technical publication on Devonian brachiopods from Illinois in 1938. In 1937 he earned his BSc degree, and was elected to Phi Beta Kappa. He enrolled for PhD at Yale University graduate school in geology the same year. Working on the major systematic monograph on a group of Paleozoic brachiopods, under the supervision of C. O. Dunbar, he received his doctorate in 1940. His thesis directly earned him the A. Cressey Morrison Prize in Natural History of the New York Academy of Sciences, and was published by the Geological Society of America as Special Paper 38 in 1942.

== Professional career ==
In the summer of 1939, Cloud worked as field assistant to A. Lincoln Washburn on Victoria Island in western Arctic Canada. For the rest of the year he taught at the Missouri School of Mines in Rolla. During 1941 to 1942 he returned to Yale University to continue work on brachiopod evolution as a Sterling Research Fellow. At the height of World War II, he was recruited to the United States Geological Survey to work on the wartime Strategic Minerals Program. He embarked on a field party to investigate manganese deposits in Maine during the summer of 1941. In 1943, he joined Virgil Barnes of the Texas Bureau of Economic Geology in the Ellenburger Project, studying the stratigraphy and sedimentology of this important early Paleozoic carbonate complex. He became chief of party for bauxite investigations in Alabama.

After the war, in 1946, Cloud was appointed as Assistant Professor of Paleontology and Curator of Invertebrate Paleontology at Harvard University. In 1948 he returned to the U.S. Geological Survey to become chief of the Branch of Paleontology and Stratigraphy. He was chief of party to map and investigate the geology of Saipan in the Mariana Islands in the western Pacific. He became Chief Paleontologist from 1949 to 1959. In 1961 he was appointed as Chairman of the Department of Geology and Geophysics at the University of Minnesota. He established the School of Earth Sciences at that university, becoming its first Head. In 1965 he moved to the University of California, Los Angeles, as Professor of Biogeology, jointly with the Institute of Geophysics and the Department of Geology. In 1968 he transferred to the University of California, Santa Barbara campus, as full Professor. At UCSB he founded the Preston Cloud Research Laboratory, originally dedicated to paleomicrobiology and to studies of the first lunar geological samples from the Apollo 11 space mission. In addition, between 1974 and 1979 he was again a member of the U.S. Geological Survey based in Santa Barbara. He retired in 1974, but continued as Professor Emeritus. He spent the rest of his life at UCSB.

== Achievements and recognitions ==
Cloud was a member of the National Academy of Sciences for thirty years, he was chairman of the Geology Section and occupied positions in its Council and Executive Committee. In 1967-69 he headed the Academy's "Committee on Resources and Man," whose alarming report "Resources and Man" introduced to a wider public, among other things, the work on energy-resources of his friend M. King Hubbert, and the Hubbert peak theory of Peak oil production. He also gave the Hadean geologic eon, Earth's earliest, its name, using the Greek word for the Underworld to refer to a molten state of constant heat.

Cloud was the author of over 200 scientific and lay publications. Notably, his 1978 book, Cosmos, Earth, and Man: A Short History of the Universe, written for a general readership, has been called 'one of the first and finest presentations of "a more ample and more coherent picture of the world"' (Alles), and his 1988 Oasis in Space: Earth History from the Beginning a "comprehensive work of synthesis and reflection... a documented history of the earth and life on it... and an impressive capstone to his remarkable scholarship" (Crowell).

One of Cloud's scientific heirs, his nephew John P. Grotzinger, was the Project Scientist for the NASA Mars Science Laboratory Curiosity rover Mission Team.

In 1990 special volume titled “Proterozoic Evolution and Environments” was published in the American Journal of Science in honour of Cloud's works.

University of California, Santa Barbara has a graduate student award named Preston Cloud Memorial Awards, which is given annually and carries minimum $200 for first-time attendance at a national or major meeting of a professional organization such as the Geological Society of America, American Geophysical Union, Association of American Petroleum Geologists, or for a student presenting a talk at such a meeting for the first time.

=== Cambrian Explosion ===
Preston Cloud was the first scientist to systematically recognise the importance of the rich fossils of the Cambrian rocks in evolutionary terms. In order to explain the somewhat sudden appearance of diverse animals during the Cambrian Period, he invented the term "eruptive radiation" in his 1948 paper. According to him, the earlier use of the term like "explosive" was misleading because the actual evolution could occur over a period of millions of years, and it "probably did not make a loud noise," he described, as implicated by the term. He postulated that adaptive radiation in any favourable ecological condition could always result in diversification of an original population into several distinct lineages, thus giving rise to eruptive evolution. Although his innovative thinking was largely ignored at the time, extensive research on the Cambrian fauna since the late 1970s, such as the fossils of the Burgess Shale, has established that the bio-geological event is a true documentation of the evolutionary origins of the animals, especially the body plans of modern animals.

== Personal life ==
Cloud was a noted public speaker and symposium participant on the subjects of resources, the human future, origin of life and the primitive earth, and he regularly delivered many popular lectures.

Cloud was of small stature, and with a rather Asian-like complexion. During his service in World War II, as D. L. Peck, Director of the U.S. Geological Survey, noted in a letter dated January 29, 1941: "[Preston Cloud] created quite a stir among the locals who suspected that this person of slight stature, emerging from holes in the ground, must certainly be a Japanese spy in their midst.” At 5'6", he would often put his desk and chairs on 4-inch-high raisers so that, as he claimed, he could look down on others to show his authority.

Cloud was an ardent humanist.

In graduate school, Preston was engaged to Mildred Porter. When Preston resigned from Harvard, they were divorced. In his time at Washington, he married Frances Webster, with whom he had three children, Karen, Lisa, and Kevin. The family moved to Minnesota in 1961, and though Preston and Frances were amicably divorced in 1965, two years later Preston relocated the entire family to Santa Barbara, California, when he accepted a professorship at the University of California, Santa Barbara.

In Santa Barbara, Preston met and, in 1973, married Janice Gibson, an opera singer and mother of three children, Morgan, Dante, and Amanda. Preston and Janis remained together for the remainder of his life. Preston Cloud died at home, on January 16, 1991, of pneumonia, brought on as a complication of Lou Gehrig's disease.

== Awards ==
- 1941, awarded the A. Cressey Morrison Award in Natural History, New York Academy of Science
- 1956, awarded the Rockefeller Public Service Award
- 1956, elected an honorary fellow of the Paleontological Society of India
- 1959, awarded the Department of Interior Distinguished Service Award
- 1961, elected to the National Academy of Sciences
- 1969, elected to the American Academy of Arts and Sciences
- 1971, awarded the Paleontological Society Medal
- 1973, awarded the Lucius Wilbur Cross Medal of the American Philosophical Society
- 1973, elected to the American Philosophical Society
- 1976, awarded the Penrose Medal by the Geological Society of America
- 1977, awarded the Charles Doolittle Walcott Medal by the National Academy of Sciences
- 1980, elected a Foreign Member, Polish Academy of Sciences
- 1982, elected Fellow of Guggenheim Foundation

== Books ==
- Cloud, Preston (1942). Terebratuloid Brachiopoda of the Silurian and Devonian. The Society.
- Cloud, Preston (1948). Some Problems and Patterns of Evolution Exemplified by Fossil Invertebrates. Society for the Study of Evolution.
- Cloud, Preston (1969). Our Disappearing Earth Resources. Field Enterprises Educational Corporation.
- Cloud (with Gibor, Aharon), Preston (1970). "The Oxygen Cycle". Scientific American. 223 (3). W.H. Freeman: 111–23. Bibcode:1970SciAm.223c.110C. doi:10.1038/scientificamerican0970-110. PMID 5459721.
- Cloud, Preston (1976). Major Features of Crustal Evolution. Geological Society of South Africa.
- Cloud, Preston (1978). Cosmos, Earth and Man: Short History of the Universe. New Haven, Conn.: Yale University Press. ISBN 978-0300021462.
- Cloud (with Dunham, Kingsley Charles, and Wilson, John Tuzo), Preston (1989). The Evolving Earth. Guild Publishing.
- Cloud, Preston (1989). Oasis in Space: Earth History from the Beginning. W W Norton & Co Inc. ISBN 978-0393305838.
