= Josephine W. Cooper =

American geologist (1905–2010)

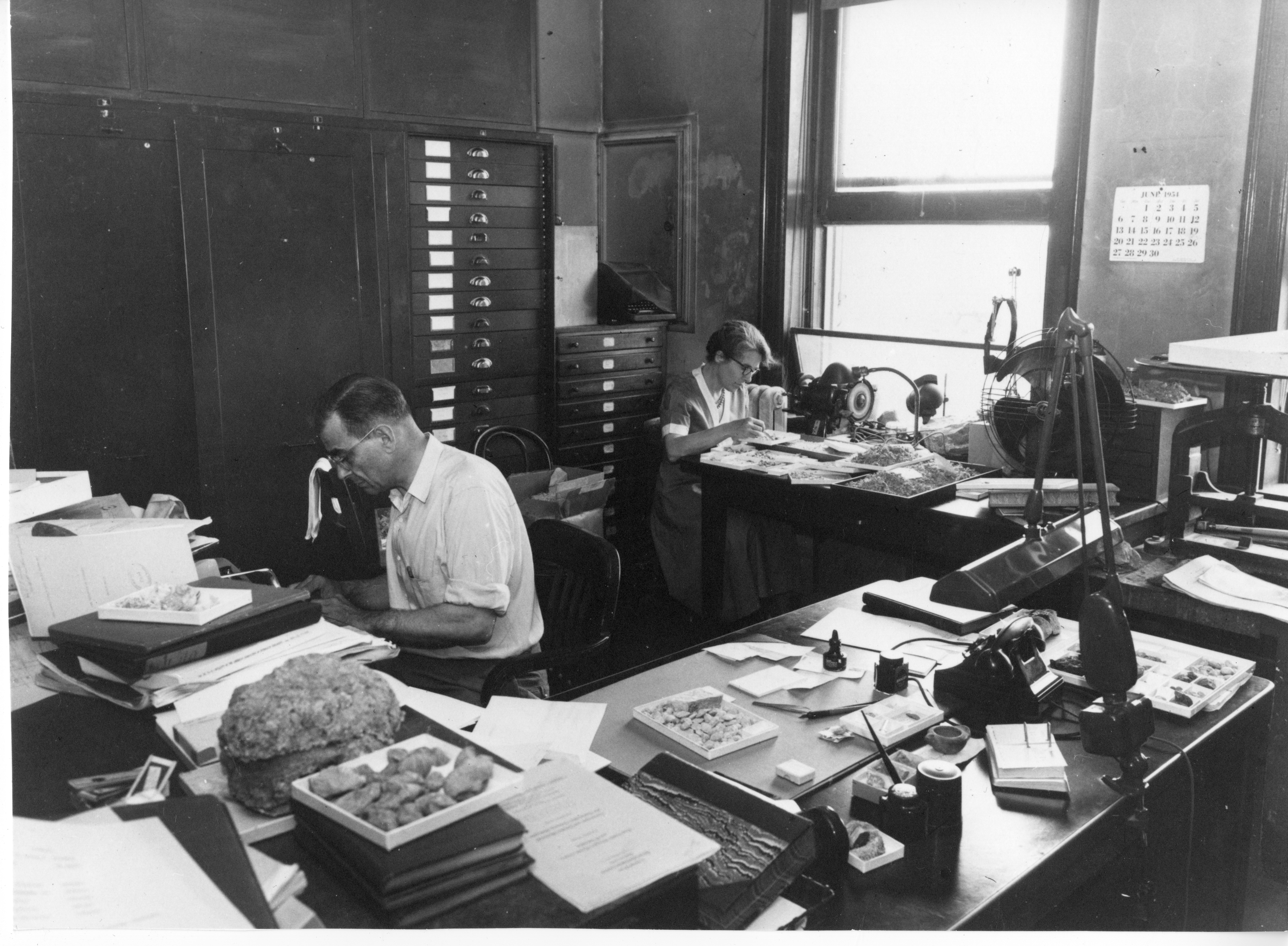
- Born: June 10, 1905; Iowa City
- Died: December 19, 2010 (aged 105); Raleigh
- Alma mater: Yale University; Holliston High School; Mount Holyoke College
- Occupation: Geologist
- Employer: National Museum of Natural History (1954–1987)
- Spouse(s): G. Arthur Cooper

Josephine Wells Cooper (June 10, 1905 – December 19, 2010) was an American geologist. Married to Smithsonian Institution paleobiologist G. Arthur Cooper for seventy years, she spent much of her life studying fossils alongside her husband. Cooper worked for the United States Geological Survey and became an expert translator of geological articles published in Soviet Russia.

== Early life and education ==
Josephine P. Wells on June 10, 1905, in Iowa City, Iowa. She grew up in the Boston area and graduated from Holliston High School in 1922. Josephine attended Mount Holyoke College, graduating in 1926 with a degree in geology and English. She went on to study geology at Yale University at a graduate level.

She met Gustav Arthur Cooper while they were both studying geology at Yale. They married in 1930 and moved to Washington, D.C., where he started his work at the Smithsonian Institution. She reared their children, Arthur W. and Anne, in the 1930s and 1940s.

== Career ==
While raising their children, Cooper assisted her husband in his work collecting and identifying fossils at the Smithsonian. Although she never worked for the Smithsonian, those at the National Museum of Natural History would later say that "her contributions to understanding our paleontology collections were invaluable." In 1966, she was one of the founders of the Ladies Advisory Committee of the Smithsonian Society of Associates, later known as the Smithsonian Women's Committee, which raised funds for educational and other Smithsonian activities.

Cooper began working in the 1950s at the Names Committee of the United States Geological Survey. She learned Russian in order to translate geological articles which were being published behind the Iron Curtain. She became so proficient that she was a translating resource for geologists throughout the English-speaking world.

== Later life and death ==
After Arthur's retirement, he and Josephine moved to Raleigh, North Carolina in 1987. They traveled throughout the world together in later life before he died in 2000.

Cooper died on December 19, 2010.
