= Alan Cheetham =

American paleontologist

Alan H. Cheetham is a paleobiologist and retired senior scientist and curator of invertebrate paleontology at the Smithsonian Institution's National Museum of Natural History.

Born in El Paso, Texas, January 30, 1928, Cheetham grew up in Taos, New Mexico, received B.S. (New Mexico Institute of Mining and Technology, 1950) and M.S. (Louisiana State University, 1952) degrees in geology, and, under the guidance of Norman D. Newell, obtained his Ph.D. in paleontology from Columbia University in 1959. Until joining the Smithsonian in 1966, Cheetham was a member of the geology faculty at Louisiana State University; during his tenure there, he was also a visiting postdoctoral fellow at the Natural History Museum in London (1961) and a guest professor at the Stockholm University, Sweden (1964). He retired from the Smithsonian in 2001 and resides in Santa Fe, New Mexico.

Much of his research includes testing evolutionary models in the fossil record, particularly the theory of punctuated equilibrium. His research is focused on the systematics and morphometrics of late Mesozoic and Cenozoic bryozoans found in deposits located in the Caribbean, especially the Dominican Republic, Panama, Costa Rica, and Venezuela, and the Gulf coast of the United States, particularly Florida, Alabama, and Mississippi. He has also worked extensively on Cenozoic bryozoans in England and southern Scandinavia and was a contributor to the Deep Sea Drilling Project on Cenozoic bryozoans recovered from the Atlantic and Pacific oceans. In April 1997 Cheetham was awarded the Raymond C. Moore Medal for Excellence in Paleontology by the Society for Sedimentary Geology. In November 2001 he received the Paleontological Society Medal; he was, during the same year, honored with a festschrift titled Evolutionary Patterns, edited by Jeremy Jackson, Scott Lidgard, and Frank McKinney.

He is married to the former Marjorie Rogers; they have four children and two grandchildren.
