= Lee Wilson (author) =

American author and geologist (1920–2008)

James Lee Wilson
- Born: December 1, 1920
- Died: February 13, 2008 (aged 87)
- Education: Rice University (BA); University of Texas at Austin (MA); Yale University (PhD)
- Known for: Research on carbonate sedimentary rocks and carbonate facies
- Notable work: Carbonate Facies in Geologic History (1975)
- Awards: Sidney Powers Memorial Award (2002); Honorary Member, American Association of Petroleum Geologists (1987); AAPG Distinguished Educator Award (1995)
- Scientific career
- Fields: Geology, Paleontology, Sedimentology
- Institutions: Rice University; University of Texas at Austin; University of Michigan; Shell Development Company

James Lee Wilson (December 1, 1920 – February 13, 2008) was an American distinguished professor, geologist, paleontologist, and sedimentologist. His research focused on carbonate sedimentary rocks and sedimentary geology.

== Biography ==
Wilson received a B.A. degree in Geology from Rice University in 1942 and an M.A. in geology from the University of Texas at Austin in 1944. In 1949, he obtained his Ph.D. in Paleontology from Yale University.

Wilson served as an associate professor at the University of Texas, Austin, and later worked as a research geologist for The Shell Development Company in Houston. He subsequently returned to Rice University, where he held the Harry Carothers Weiss Chair of Geology and served as chair of the geology department.

In 1979, Wilson joined the University of Michigan, where he taught until his retirement in 1986 as a distinguished professor.

Wilson was a member of Geological Society of America, American Association of Petroleum Geologists, Society for Sedimentary Geology, International Association of Sedimentology, Gulf Coast Association of Geological Societies, the Paleontological Society, and the South Texas Geological Society.

== Publications ==
Wilson authored Carbonate Facies in Geologic History (1975), a book focused on carbonate rock stratigraphy and sedimentary environments. The publication has been used as a reference in geological studies and has been translated into several languages, including Chinese and Russian.

== Honors and recognition ==
In 1987, Wilson was named an Honorary Member of the American Association of Petroleum Geologists. In 1995, he received the organization's Distinguished Educator Award. In 1996, the Society for Sedimentary Geology established the James Lee Wilson Award for young geoscientists in recognition of his contributions to the field.

In 2002, Wilson was awarded the Sidney Powers Memorial Award, the highest honor presented by the American Association of Petroleum Geologists.
