= Mary L. Droser =

American paleontologist

Mary Droser
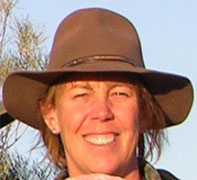
- Born: United States
- Education: University of Southern California; Binghamton University; University of Rochester
- Spouse: Nigel Hughes
- Scientific career
- Fields: Paleontology
- Workplaces: University of California, Riverside
- Thesis: Trends in Extant and Depth of bioturbation in Great Basin Precambrian-Ordovician Strata, California, Nevada and Utah (1987)
- Doctoral advisor: David Bottjer

Mary L. Droser is an American paleontologist and distinguished professor of geology at the University of California, Riverside. Her research focuses on evolutionary paleoecology and the early evolution of animal life, particularly the Ediacaran biota of South Australia. Droser has also been involved in the nomination of the Flinders Ranges as a World Heritage Site. The nomination dossier was submitted to UNESCO in 2026, with a decision expected in 2027.

== Early life and education ==
Droser says that spending summers with her family on Shelter Island, New York first inspired her interest in the natural world. She says, "At age 5 I announced I wanted to be a marine biologist, then by age 10 I’d decided to become a geologist".

She pursued geology at the University of Rochester and Binghamton University, and went on to obtain a PhD in paleontology at the University of Southern California.

== Career ==
Droser has been travelling to the Flinders Ranges since around 2001, first with her young family, to study the Ediacaran fossils on what was Nilpena Station (on land that was then part of a cattle station, now part of Nilpena Ediacara National Park).

=== Discoveries and naming ===
In 2008, Droser's discovery of the fossil Funisia dorothea in Australia was published in the journal Science. Funisia is a single-species genus of upright worm-like animals that lived 555 million years ago. Funisia was hailed as the first known species to sexually reproduce. She named the species to honor her mother, Dorothy Droser, saying "She's come with me on digs and done all the cooking and taken care of the kids. It seemed the right thing to do."

Droser named the fossil Obamus, after U.S. president Barack Obama. In 2018, while exploring the Flinders Ranges, over 200 km (120 mi) north of Adelaide in South Australia, Droser's team found the 550-million-year-old fossil. She explained that the creature resembled an ear, a distinctive feature of Obama, and so named it for the former president. On the same trip to the Flinders Ranges in 2018, the team also discovered the fossil Attenborites janeae, which Droser named for naturalist Sir David Attenborough.

=== Other activities ===
As of 2023, Droser is part of a team acting on behalf of the Government of South Australia and the traditional owners of the Flinders Ranges, the Adnyamathanha people, to lodge the nomination for the Flinders Ranges as a World Heritage Site. Research done by her, along with South Australian Museum palaeontologist Diego Garcia-Bellido, will be submitted as part of the UNESCO World Heritage nomination, which will be voted on in 2026.

== Awards and honors ==
- 1997: Charles Schuchert Award given by the Paleontological Society to a person under 40 whose work reflects excellence and promise in the science of paleontology
- 2020: Doctoral Dissertation Advisor/Mentor Award from University of California, Riverside
- 2022: National Academy of Sciences Award in Early Earth and Life Sciences - Charles Doolittle Walcott Medal
