= David Bottjer =

American paleontologist

David J. Bottjer is an American paleontologist. He is Professor of Earth Sciences, Biological Sciences, and Environmental Studies at the University of Southern California.

Bottjer completed undergraduate studies at Haverford College and earned his PhD in Geology from Indiana University, Bloomington in 1978. He received the 2014 Raymond C. Moore Medal from the Society for Sedimentary Geology. He was also the 2019 winner of the Paleontological Society Medal.
