= Nicholas Tosca =

Geochemist and mineralogist

- Education: University at Albany, SUNY (BS); Stony Brook University (MS, PhD)
- Awards: Max Hey Medal (2013); Mineralogical Society of America Award (2015); Philip Leverhulme Prize (2015)
- Scientific career
- Fields: Geochemistry; Mineralogy; Sedimentology; Planetary science
- Workplaces: University of Cambridge; University of Oxford; University of St Andrews; Harvard University

Nicholas James Tosca is a geochemist and mineralogist who studies interactions between natural water and minerals and the environmental histories of Earth and Mars. Since 2020, he has been Professor of Mineralogy and Petrology at the University of Cambridge. He is an Official Fellow in Natural Sciences at King's College, Cambridge, and an associate director of the Leverhulme Centre for Life in the Universe.

Tosca is a member of the core science team of NASA's Mars 2020 Perseverance rover mission. His honours include the 2013 Max Hey Medal, the 2015 Mineralogical Society of America Award and a 2015 Philip Leverhulme Prize.

== Education and career ==
Tosca received a BS from the University at Albany, SUNY, in 2001, followed by an MS in 2003 and a PhD in 2007 from Stony Brook University.

After completing his doctorate, Tosca held postdoctoral research positions at Harvard University and Cambridge. He subsequently held academic appointments at the University of St Andrews and the University of Oxford. At Oxford, he was Professor of Sedimentary Geology before his election to the Cambridge professorship, which took effect on 1 July 2020.

== Research ==
Tosca's research combines laboratory experiments, thermodynamic modeling and observations of minerals and sedimentary rocks. His group studies how the chemistry of natural water influences mineral formation and how mineral assemblages can be used to reconstruct past climates and surface environments. His early work on Mars included interpreting the sulfate-bearing rocks examined by the Opportunity rover at Meridiani Planum. This research used thermodynamic calculations and terrestrial analogues to investigate the evaporation and later alteration of acidic, saline fluids and the formation of sulfate minerals and haematite-rich concretions.

In a 2008 paper in Science, Tosca, Andrew H. Knoll and Scott M. McLennan used mineralogical constraints from Mars to estimate the water activity of ancient Martian fluids. They concluded that many of the environments examined would have contained brines too saline for known terrestrial organisms. The study distinguished between conditions that specialised organisms might tolerate and the more restrictive conditions under which life could originate. Tosca's research on terrestrial environments includes the chemical evolution of Precambrian seawater, the relationship between ocean chemistry and climate, and the mineralogical conditions associated with the preservation of ancient organisms. He has also contributed to research on mineral formation in early eukaryotic organisms.

=== Mars exploration ===
In 2021, Tosca was announced as a member of the core science team for the Perseverance mission. At the time, Cambridge described him as the only scientist based at a UK institution selected for the mission's core science team.

His work with the mission involves using chemical and mineralogical measurements of rocks in Jezero crater to reconstruct the chemistry of the crater's former lake and other ancient environmental conditions. He has also participated in rover operations, including planning measurements and interpreting results from the Planetary Instrument for X-ray Lithochemistry, or PIXL. Tosca has additionally been involved in scientific planning for the proposed Mars Sample Return programme.

== Awards and honours ==
- 2013 – Max Hey Medal, jointly awarded with Hendrik Heinz by the Mineralogical Society of the UK and Ireland.
- 2015 – Mineralogical Society of America Award.
- 2015 – Philip Leverhulme Prize in Earth sciences.
- 2025–2026 – Mineralogical Society of America Distinguished Lecturer.
