= Niles Eldredge =

American paleontologist (born 1943)

- Born: August 24, 1943 (age 83)
- Education: Columbia University (BA, PhD)
- Known for: Macroevolution; punctuated equilibria; biodiversity crisis
- Awards: Charles Schuchert Award (1979); Paleontological Society Medal (2008)
- Scientific career
- Workplaces: Columbia University
- Thesis: Geographic variation and evolution in Phacops rana (Green 1832) and Phacops iowensis Delo, 1935, in the Middle Devonian of North America (1969)
- Academic advisors: Norman D. Newell
- Doctoral students: Gregory Edgecombe, Bruce S. Lieberman
- Website: nileseldredge.com

Niles Eldredge (/ˈɛldrɪdʒ/ ELD-rij; born August 25, 1943) is an American biologist and paleontologist, who, along with Stephen Jay Gould, proposed the theory of punctuated equilibrium in 1972.

== Career and research ==
=== Education ===
Eldredge began his undergraduate studies in Latin at Columbia University. Before completing his degree, he switched to the study of geology under Norman D. Newell. It was at this time that his work at the American Museum of Natural History began under the combined Columbia University-American Museum graduate studies program.

Eldredge graduated summa cum laude from Columbia College of Columbia University in 1965, and enrolled in the university's doctoral program while continuing his research at the museum. He completed his PhD in 1969.

=== Paleontology ===
In 1969, Eldredge became a curator in the Department of Invertebrates at the American Museum of Natural History, and subsequently a curator in the Invertebrate Paleontology section, a position from which he recently retired. He was also an adjunct professor at the City University of New York. His specialty was the evolution of mid-Paleozoic Phacopida trilobites, a group of extinct arthropods that lived between 543 and 245 million years ago.

=== Evolutionary theory ===
Eldredge and Stephen Jay Gould proposed punctuated equilibria in 1972. Punctuated equilibrium is a refinement to evolutionary theory. It describes patterns of descent taking place in "fits and starts" separated by long periods of stability.

Eldredge went on to develop a hierarchical vision of evolutionary and ecological systems. Around this time, he became focused on the rapid destruction of many of the world's habitats and species. In his book Unfinished Synthesis (1985), he proposed an extended evolutionary synthesis.

Throughout his career, he has used repeated patterns in the history of life to refine ideas on how the evolutionary process actually works. Eldredge is proponent of the importance of environment in explaining the patterns in evolution.

Eldredge is a critic of the gene-centered view of evolution. His most recent venture is the development of an alternative account to the gene-based notions of evolutionary psychology to explain human behavior.

He has published more than 160 scientific articles, books, and reviews, including Reinventing Darwin, an examination of current controversies in evolutionary biology, and Dominion, a consideration of the ecological and evolutionary past, present, and future of Homo sapiens.

As of 2013, Eldredge has been listed on the Advisory Council of the National Center for Science Education.

=== Publications ===
- With J. Cracraft (eds.) 1979. Phylogenetic Analysis and Palaeontology. Columbia University Press, New York
- With J. Cracraft. 1980. Phylogenetic Patterns and the Evolutionary Process. Method and Theory in Comparative Biology. Columbia University Press, New York, 349 p. Japanese edition, Soju Shobo, 1990
- 1982. The Monkey Business: A Scientist Looks at Creationism. Pocket Books, New York. 157 p. Japanese edition, 1992
- With I. Tattersall. 1982. The Myths of Human Evolution. Columbia University Press, New York. 197 p. Japanese edition arranged through Columbia U. Press.; Spanish edition 1986: Fondo de Cultura Economica, Mexico; Portuguese ed.: 1984, Zahar Editores, Rio de Janeiro; Italian ed., 1984: Boringheri
- With S. M. Stanley (eds.). 1984. Living Fossils. Springer Verlag, New York.
- 1985. Time Frames. Simon and Schuster, New York. 240 pp. Great Britain: Heilman; Princeton University reprint edition. Italian edition, 1991, hopefulmonster editore
- 1985. Unfinished Synthesis: Biological Hierarchies and Modern Evolutionary Thought. Oxford University Press, New York
- 1987. Life Pulse: Episodes in the History of Life. Facts on File, New York. Pelican edition (Great Britain)
- (ed.). 1987. Natural History Reader on Evolution. Columbia University Press, New York
- 1989. Macroevolutionary Dynamics: Species, Niches and Adaptive Peaks. McGraw Hill, New York. Japanese edition: McGraw Hill Publishing Co., Japan, Ltd.ëë
- With D. Eldredge and G. Eldredge. 1989. The Fossil Factory. Addison Wesley Publishing Co., Reading, Massachusetts
- 1991. The Miner's Canary: Extinctions Past and Present. Prentice Hall Books, New York; English edition: Virgin Publishing, Ltd.; Korean edition: Moeum Publishers; Italian edition: Sperling & Kupfer. German Edition: Spektrum; U.S. paperback edition: Princeton University Press
- 1991. Fossils: The Evolution and Extinction of Species. Photographs by Murray Alcosser. Abrams, New York; Australian edition: Houghton Mifflin; English edition: Aurum Press; German edition: Belser Verlag
- (ed.). 1992. Systematics, Ecology and the Biodiversity Crisis. Columbia University Press, New York
- With M. Grene. 1992. Interactions: The Biological Context of Social Systems. Columbia University Press, Cambridge, Massachusetts
- 1995. Reinventing Darwin: The Great Debate at the High Table of Evolutionary Theory. John Wiley and Sons, New York; English edition: Orion; Italian edition: Giulio Einaudi Editore
- 1995. Dominion. Henry Holt and Co; paperback edition, University of California Press, 1997
- 1998. Life in the Balance: Humanity and the Biodiversity Crisis. Princeton University Press. Portugal: Dinalivre; China/Taiwan: International Publishing Co.; Poland: Proscynski; Japan: Seidosha; Spain: TusQuets; Italy: Giulio Einaudi Editore
- 1999. The Pattern of Evolution. W. H. Freeman and Co., New York
- 2000. The Triumph of Evolution...And the Failure of Creationism. W.H. Freeman and Co., New York
- (ed.). 2002. Life on Earth: An Encyclopaedia of Biodiversity, Ecology and Evolution. ABC-CLIO, Santa Barbara, California
- 2004. Why We Do It: Rethinking Sex and the Selfish Gene. W.W. Norton, New York
- 2005. Darwin: Discovering the Tree of Life. W.W. Norton, New York
- 2014. Extinction and evolution : what fossils reveal about the history of life, ISBN 978-1-77085-359-1; Firefly Books, Toronto
- 2014. Concrete Jungle. New York City and Our Last Best Hope for a Sustainable Future. University of California Press, Oakland.
- 2015. Eternal Ephemera: Adaptation and the Origin of Species from the Nineteenth Century through Punctuated Equilibria and Beyond. Columbia University Press, New York, New York.
- 2016. With T. Pievani, E. Serrelli, and I. Tëmkin (eds.). Evolutionary Theory. A Hierarchical Perspective. University of Chicago Press, Chicago.
- 2024. With Salva Duran-Nebreda, R.Alexander Bentley, Blai Vidiella, Andrej Spiridonov, Michael J.O'Brien, Sergi Valverde On the multiscale dynamics of punctuated evolution. Trends in Ecology&Evolution (Cell Press). Vol.39 Issue 8 (aug/2024).
- 2024. With Salva Duran-Nebreda, Blai Vidiella, Andrej Spiridonov, Michael J.O'Brien, R.Alexander Bentley, Sergi Valverde The many ways toward punctuated evolution. Wiley Palaeontology. Vol.67, Issue 5 (oct/2024).

== Personal life ==
Eldredge enjoys playing jazz trumpet and is an collector of 19th century cornets; he has more than 500 in his home in Ridgewood, New Jersey.

Eldredge possesses a chart of the historical development of cornets (the musical instruments), which he uses as a comparison with that of the development of trilobites. The differences between them are meant to highlight the failures of intelligent design by comparing a system that is definitely designed, with a system that is not designed.

=== Political activism ===
In January 2017, Eldredge became an 'Initiator' for the Refuse Fascism movement launched in the United States just months after the 2016 U.S. Presidential Election. The movement was an effort to deny Barack Obama's successor - Donald Trump - from taking office on Inauguration Day (January 20, 2017). The group's aim was to 'stop the Trump-Pence regime before it starts.'
