= Hans J. Hofmann =

Canadian paleontologist (1936–2010)

Hans Jörg Hofmann (3 October 1936, Kiel, Germany – 19 May 2010, Montreal, Quebec, Canada) was a paleontologist, specializing in the study of Precambrian fossils using computer modelling and image analysis to quantify morphologic attributes.

Born in Germany, Hofmann immigrated to Montreal, Quebec, Canada and studied geology at McGill University, where he earned a Ph.D. under the supervision of T. H. Clark. He taught for three years at the University of Cincinnati and then worked at the Geological Survey of Canada. He was a professor in the geology department of the Université de Montréal for 31 years (1969–2000). He spent the last ten years of his life as a researcher in the Redpath Museum and an adjunct professor in the Department of Earth and Planetary Sciences at McGill.

The National Academy of Sciences noted him for, "his pioneering discoveries of fossils that have illuminated life's early evolution, from Archean stromatolites and Proterozoic cyanobacteria, to the rise of multicellular organisms."

Hofmann's contributions have shed light on the biologic, stratigraphic, and evolutionary significance of various stromatolites, microfossils, macrofossils, and trace fossils.

== Awards ==
- 1995, Awarded the Willet G. Miller Medal by the Royal Society of Canada
- 2002, Awarded the Charles Doolittle Walcott Medal by the National Academy of Sciences
