= J. William Schopf =

American paleontologist

- Born: September 27, 1941 (age 85); Urbana, Illinois, U.S.
- Other name: Bill Schopf
- Education: Oberlin College, Harvard University
- Known for: Microfossils
- Spouses: Julie Morgan (m. 1966; div. 1979) Jane Shen-Miller (m. 1980)
- Children: James Christopher
- Awards: Mary Clark Thompson Medal (1986); Oparin Medal (1989); Paleontological Society Medal (2012); Charles Doolittle Walcott Medal (2013)
- Scientific career
- Fields: Paleobiology; Evolutionary biology
- Workplaces: University of California Los Angeles
- Website: epss.ucla.edu/people/faculty/594/

James William Schopf (born September 27, 1941) is an American paleobiologist and professor of earth sciences at the University of California Los Angeles. He is also Director of the Center for the Study of Evolution and the Origin of Life, and a member of the Department of Earth and Space Sciences, the Institute of Geophysics and Planetary Physics, and the Molecular Biology Institute at UCLA. He is most well known for his study of Precambrian prokaryotic life in Australia's Apex chert. Schopf has published extensively in the peer reviewed literature about the origins of life on Earth. He is the first to discover Precambrian microfossils in stromatolitic sediments of Australia (1965), South Africa (1966), Russia (1977), India (1978), and China (1984). He served as NASA's principal investigator of lunar samples during 1969–1974.

== Biography ==
James William Schopf was born in Urbana, Illinois, to father James M. Schopf, a paleontologist, and mother Esther Schopf, a school teacher. He was educated at Oberlin College, from where he graduated with AB degree in high honours in 1963. He joined Harvard University in 1963 and earned AM degree in 1965, and PhD in 1968. He was immediately appointed to the faculty of the University of California Los Angeles as Assistant Professor of Paleobiology. He was promoted to Associate Professor in 1970, and to full Professor in 1973. Since 1984 he holds a join post of Director of Center for the Study of Evolution and the Origin of Life at UCLA.

== Oldest fossils ==
Schopf is the discoverer of one of the oldest microfossils on Earth. He was the first to discover Precambrian fossils around the world. In 1987, with Bonnie M. Packer, he reported the discovery of microfossils from the Early Archean Apex Basalt and Towers Formation of northwestern Western Australia. He suggested that the apparent cells were cyanobacteria, and therefore oxygen-producing photosynthesis, which lived about 3.3 billion to 3.5 billion years ago. This was the oldest known fossil at the time. However, Martin Brasier and his team from University of Oxford sought to discredit the fossils as "secondary artefacts formed from amorphous graphite" in 2002. Brasier then claimed to have discovered found an older fossil from the same region in 2011.

== Personal life ==
Schopf married Julie Morgan in 1966, had a son James Christopher in 1970, and divorced in 1979. He remarried Jane Shen-Miller, a biochemist, on January 16, 1980 and they reside in Los Angeles.

== Awards and honours ==
Schopf was honoured with the Sigma Xi Distinguished Lecturer in 1976, Rubey Lecturer in 1976, M.W. Haas Visiting Distinguished Professor of Geology in 1979, Golden Year Distinguished Lecturerin 1980, University of Cincinnati Sigma Xi distinguished lecturer in 1980, extraordinary visiting professor at the University of Nijmegen during 1980–81, Distinguished Lecturer at the Buffalo Museum of Science in 1982; J.A. Bownocker Lecturer at the Ohio State University in 1982, Gold Shield Prize for Academic Excellence in 1993, Frontiers of Knowledge Lecturer in 2000. He is the recipient of the Mary Clark Thompson Medal in 1986, The Paleontological Society Medal in 2012 and the Charles Doolittle Walcott Medal in 2013. He has received two Guggenheim Fellowships (in 1973, for work in Australia; and in 1988, for work in the Netherlands), and Alexander von Humboldt Prize Fellow from Germany. He also received Oparin Medal, Alan T. Waterman Award in 1972, Thompson Medal of the U.S. National Academy of Sciences, and Waterman Medal of the U.S. National Science Board. He was selected by the Botanical Society of America as a Centennial Scientist in 2006.

He is elected member of the Institute of Geophysics and Planetary Physics in 1973, Board of Trustees of UCLA Foundation in 1983, Molecular Biology Institute in 1991, of the US National Academy of Sciences in 1998, the American Philosophical Society, the American Academy of Arts and Sciences, the American Academy of Microbiology in 2011, the Linnean Society of London (as Foreign Member), elected President of the International Society for the Study of the Origin of Life, and he is the first-elected Foreign Member of the Scientific Presidium of the A.N. Bach Institute of Biochemistry of the Russian Academy of Sciences. He is life member of the National Center for Science Education.

== Select bibliography ==
=== Books ===
- Schopf, J. William (1992). Major events in the history of life. Boston: Jones and Bartlett.
- Schopf, J. William; Klein, Cornelis (1992). The Proterozoic Biosphere: A Multidisciplinary Study. Cambridge: Cambridge University Press. ISBN 978-0-5213-6615-1.
- Campbell, John H.; Schopf, J. William (1994). Creative Evolution?!. Boston: Jones and Bartlett. ISBN 978-0-8672-0961-7.
- Schopf, J. William (1999). Evolution!: Facts and Fallacies. San Diego: Academic Press. ISBN 978-0-1262-8860-5.
- Schopf, J. William (2001). Cradle of Life: The Discovery of Earth's Earliest Fossils. Princeton, N.J.: Princeton University Press. ISBN 9780691088648.
- Schopf, J. William (2002). Life's Origin: The Beginnings of Biological Evolution. Berkeley, Calif.: University of California Press. ISBN 978-0-5202-3390-4.

=== Articles ===
- Schopf, J. William (September 1999). "Life on Mars : tempest in a teapot? A first-hand account" (PDF). Proceedings of the American Philosophical Society. 143 (3): 359–378. Archived from the original (PDF) on November 14, 2013.
