= Joan Oró =

Spanish biochemist (1923–2004)

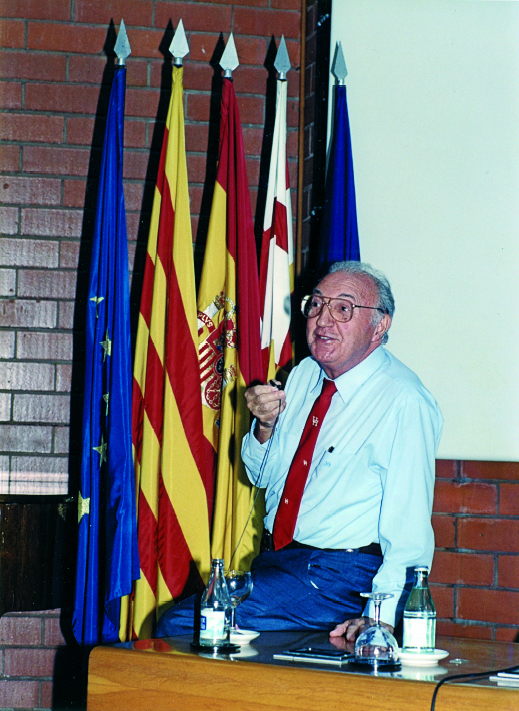
- Joan Oró i Florensa
- Born: Joan Oro; 26 October 1923; Lleida, Catalonia, Spain
- Died: 2 September 2004 (aged 80); Barcelona, Catalonia, Spain
- Education: University of Barcelona, Baylor College of Medicine
- Known for: Research on understanding the origin of life
- Awards: Oparin Medal
- Scientific career
- Fields: Biochemistry
- Institutions: NASA
- Thesis: (1956)

Joan Oró i Florensa, 1st Marquess of Oró (Catalan pronunciation: [ʒuˈan uˈɾo]; 26 October 1923 – 2 September 2004) was a Spanish Catalan biochemist, whose research has been of importance in understanding the origin of life. Living in the United States for many years, he participated in several NASA missions, including the Apollo mission to the Moon and the Viking lander. He received the Oparin Medal for his contributions to the field of origins of life.

== Early life and education ==
Joan Oró i Florensa was born on 26 October 1923, in Lleida, Catalonia, Spain, the youngest of five children.

After completing secondary school late owing to the Spanish Civil War, he completed his undergraduate studies in chemistry, focusing on organic chemistry, at the University of Barcelona in 1947. He first tried to earn a living as a chemist, but that did not work, so he spent three years working at his father's bakery and saving money.

After getting married and having children, he and his family moved to the United States in 1952, due to the scarce scientific resources offered by the Spanish academia at that time. He enrolled at the Rice Institute in Houston, Texas, and started doing graduate studies in chemical engineering. After working with Donald Rappoport, who was professor of biochemistry at Baylor College of Medicine, he switched to biochemistry, and in 1956 he obtained his PhD in biochemistry in Houston.

== Scientific and academic career ==
Oró became a full professor in University of Houston in 1963 where he founded and directed the department of biochemistry and biophysics. From the 1960s he worked with NASA on the Viking missions which explored the planet Mars. His work was essential in the analysis of samples of Martian soil, questioning early suggestions that life might have been detected.

=== Origins of life ===
One of his most important contributions was the prebiotic synthesis of the nucleobase adenine (a key component of nucleic acids) from hydrogen cyanide (HCN). He also showed that amino acids can be made from HCN plus ammonia in an aqueous solution. This was achieved during the period 1959–1962 and stands, together with the Miller-Urey experiment, as one of the fundamental results of prebiotic chemistry. It opened up a research area eventually leading to the complete synthesis of other components of nucleic acids.

=== Cometary origin of prebiotic molecules ===
Oró was also the first scientist pointing towards comets as key carriers of organic molecules to our early biosphere. This conjecture (formulated in 1961) is broadly accepted today. Although such an idea had been around for a long time, it was only when both space exploration and prebiotic chemistry fully developed that extensive evidence was in place. Comets are rich in carbon and water, bearing along precursor molecules based on carbon chemistry, such as amino acids. In this context, in 1971, Oró and co-workers published a paper revealing the high abundance of amino acids, aliphatic and aromatic hydrocarbons in the Murchison meteorite and studied the optical activity of the amino acids.

=== Viking mission ===
Oró also provided a chemical interpretation of a set of remarkable, and to some extent unexpected results reported by the Viking mission to Mars. The Viking lander performed a series of experiments, including one designed by Oró, involving a small gas chromatograph and mass spectrometer. In one of these experiments, where a set of nutrients was mixed with Martian soil samples, a sudden production of carbon dioxide was reported, initially suggesting the presence of Martian microbes, which would have shown some kind of metabolic processing of nutrients. Oró showed that a simpler, abiotic interpretation was more likely to be the correct one: the catalytic chemical oxidation of test nutrients.

== Other activities ==
Oró was also involved in political life after Spain's transition to democracy as member of the Parliament of Catalonia.

He also served as a science advisor for many American projects and committees, including those involved in the International Space Station and the future missions to Mars.

== Awards and honors ==
- 1983: Cross of Civil Order of Alfonso X el Sabio (Madrid)
- 1986: Oparin Medal from the International Society for the Study of the Origin of Life (ISSOL) (Berkeley),
- 1991: Creu de Sant Jordi
- 2000: Medalla del President Francesc Macià
- 2003: Named "Marquess of Oró" in 2003 by Royal Decree 819-32003 of 23 June.
- 2024: Premio In Memoriam (Posthumous Award) in the Premios Vanguardia in Barcelona

== Personal life and death ==
Oró married Francesca Forteza in 1948, and they had four children, the first three born in Spain and the youngest born in Houston.

Oró died in Barcelona on September 2, 2004.

Spanish nobility
New title	Marquess of Oró; 23 June 2003 – 2 September 2004	Succeeded by María Elena Oró Forteza
