= James Ferris =

American chemist (1932–2016)

James P. Ferris
- Born: 1932; Nyack, New York
- Died: March 4, 2016 (aged 83–84); Albany, New York
- Education: University of Pennsylvania; Indiana University; Massachusetts Institute of Technology
- Awards: NIH Career Award (1969); Oparin Medal (1996)
- Scientific career
- Fields: atmospheric photochemistry, origins of life, prebiotic chemistry
- Workplaces: Rensselaer Polytechnic Institute; Salk Institute for Biological Studies; Florida State University

James "Jim" P. Ferris (1932 – March 4, 2016) was an American chemist. He is known for his contributions to the understanding of the origins of life on Earth, specifically by demonstrating a successful mechanism of clay-catalyzed polymerization of RNA, providing further evidence for the RNA World Hypothesis. Additionally, his work in atmospheric photochemistry has illuminated many of the chemical processes which occur in the atmospheres of Jupiter and Saturn's moon, Titan.

== Life and career ==
Jim Ferris was born in Nyack, New York to Richard and Mabel Ferris, the youngest of five children. He completed his undergraduate studies at the University of Pennsylvania and earned a Bachelor of Science in chemistry. He went on to earn a doctorate in natural products chemistry at Indiana University, and continued his post-doctoral studies at the Massachusetts Institute of Technology.

Ferris began his career as a professor at Florida State University, and performed research at the Salk Institute for Biological Studies. He joined the Rensselaer Polytechnic Institute in 1967. He was the editor of Origins of Life and Evolution of Biospheres (OLEB), an academic journal sponsored by The International Society for the Study of the Origin of Life (ISSOL), from 1982 to 1999. He also served as president of ISSOL from 1993 to 1996.

Between 1998 and 2006, he served as director of NASA's New York Center for Studies on the Origins of Life, which would later become the New York Center for Astrobiology at Rensselaer, of which he remained an active member until 2015.

Ferris died on March 4, 2016, at Daughters of Sarah Nursing Center in Albany, New York.

== Research ==
During more than fifty years of research, Ferris made landmark contributions to the field of prebiotic chemistry. His interests in the origins of life led him to explore in detail a diverse array of prebiotic reaction mechanisms, and to make the discovery of clay-directed RNA synthesis. By providing a plausible mechanism for the prebiotic synthesis of RNA oligomers, Ferris's method strengthened the RNA world hypothesis. In an effort to uncover the conditions of the early Earth's atmosphere and further establish the relationship between atmospheric processes and prebiotic chemistry, Ferris turned to observing Jupiter and Saturn's largest and most Earth-like moon, Titan.

=== Prebiotic synthesis ===
In the late 1960s, Ferris published a set of collaborative studies with Leslie Orgel that elucidated several prebiotic pathways for the synthesis of biologically relevant macromolecules (including nucleobases, amino acids, and precursors thereof) from hydrogen cyanide and cyano compounds. In another series of publications on chemical evolution, Ferris further expanded the understanding of these and other reactions, demonstrating, for example, mechanisms of hydrogen cyanide polymerization under a variety of conditions leading to purines, pyrimidines, amino acids, and a host of organic precursor molecules.

=== Montmorillonite catalysis and RNA polymerization ===
Ferris's work in prebiotic synthesis under early Earth conditions led him to investigate the use of the mineral montmorillonite as a surface for ribonucleotide polymerization and other processes. Montmorillonite is formed by the accumulation and breakdown of volcanic ash, and may have been present on the early Earth, making it a promising candidate for catalysis of prebiotic reactions. In early publications involving montmorillonite clays, Ferris demonstrated that, following adsorption of the nucleotides to its surface, the mineral can catalytically enhance the formation of polyadenine and polycytosine oligonucleotides and cyclic adenine monophosphates. The composition of montmorillonite clays can vary, and the presence of metal cations to stabilize the mineral's distinct negative charges were shown to affect binding and catalysis, as well. Later, Ferris was able to achieve catalysis of the phosphodiester bond between several activated ribonucleotides, resulting in RNA oligomers up to 50 nucleotides in length on the clay surface.

In 2010, the Ferris research group showed that montmorillonite is capable of affecting regioselectivity of the RNA oligomers it catalyzes. Starting with a mixture of D and L enantiomers of activated ribonucleotides, up to 76% of the resulting oligomers were homochiral, providing a new direction for the as-yet unanswered question of the origin of homochirality in modern biochemistry.

=== Photochemistry on other planets ===
Ferris constructed gaseous simulations of the atmospheres of Jupiter and Titan and analyzed their composition using a combination of photochemistry techniques, including x-ray photoelectron spectroscopy and infrared spectroscopy. Information gained from these studies could then be directly compared to measurements of their respective planets. The analysis of atmospheric processes on other planets in the Solar System not only benefits the ongoing space exploration efforts of NASA, it may also hold insight into the history of our own planet, revealing atmospheric processes that would have been important to the emergence of life on a prebiotic Earth.

By preparing analogs to Titan's atmospheric aerosols and irradiating the mixture of gases used, Ferris was able to probe refractive indices and observe synthesis reactions which could be used as models and compared directly to measurements of spectroscopy data recovered from NASA's Cassini-Huygens mission to Saturn.

== Awards and recognition ==
Ferris received an NIH Career Award in 1969 which allowed him to greatly expand his research into prebiotic nucleotide synthesis. In 1996, he was awarded the Oparin Medal by ISSOL for his achievements and contributions to the field of origins of life chemistry. In 2012, the Rensselaer Polytechnic Institute established the James P. Ferris Fellowship in Astrobiology in his honor.

== Selected publications ==
- Ferris, J. P.; Hill, A. R.; Liu, R.; Orgel, L. E. (1996). "Synthesis of long prebiotic oligomers on mineral surfaces". Nature. 381 (6577): 59–61. Bibcode:1996Natur.381...59F. doi:10.1038/381059a0. hdl:2060/19980119839. PMID 8609988. S2CID 4351826.
- Ferris, J. P.; Ertem, G. (1993). "Montmorillonite Catalysis of RNA Oligomer Formation in Aqueous Solution. A Model for the Prebiotic Formation of RNA". J. Am. Chem. Soc. 115 (26): 12270–12275. doi:10.1021/ja00079a006. PMID 11540110.
- Joshi, P. C.; Aldersley, M. F. (2011). "Ferris, J. P. "Homochiral Selectivity in Rna Synthesis: Montmorillonite-Catalyzed Quaternary Reactions of D, L-Purine with D, L- Pyrimidine Nucleotides". Orig. Life Evol. Biosph. 41 (3): 213–236. Bibcode:2011OLEB...41..213J. doi:10.1007/s11084-010-9222-1. PMID 20725859. S2CID 34460522.
- Ferris, J. P. (2006). "Montmorillonite-Catalysed Formation of Rna Oligomers: The Possible Role of Catalysis in the Origins of Life". Philos. Trans. R. Soc. Lond. B Biol. Sci. 361 (1474): 1777–1786. doi:10.1098/rstb.2006.1903. PMC 1664692. PMID 17008218.
- Vuitton, V.; Tran, B.; Persans, P.; Ferris, J. P. (2009). "Determination of the complex refractive indices of Titan haze analogs using photothermal deflection spectroscopy". Icarus. 203 (2): 663–671. Bibcode:2009Icar..203..663V. doi:10.1016/j.icarus.2009.04.016.
