= Paleontological Society Medal =

Scientific society award

The Paleontological Society Medal is an award given by the Paleontological Society to a person whose eminence is based on advancement of knowledge in paleontology.

== Awardees ==
Source: Paleontological Society

Year	Recipient
1963	Raymond C. Moore
1964	G. Arthur Cooper
1966	Alfred S. Romer
1967	Carl O. Dunbar
1970	Ralph W. Chaney
1971	Preston E. Cloud
1972	Katherine Van Winkle Palmer
1973	George Gaylord Simpson
1974	John W. Wells
1975	Frank M. Carpenter
1976	Kenneth E. Caster
1977	Wendell Woodring
1978	James M. Schopf
1979	Norman D. Newell
1980	Everett C. Olson
1981	Harold S. Ladd
1982	Alfred R. Loeblich Jr & Helen Tappan
1983	Harry B. Whittington
1984	Curt Teichert
1985	William A. Cobban
1986	Heinz A. Lowenstam
1987	Harlan P. Banks
1988	Rousseau H. Flower & J. Wyatt Durham
1989	Thomas W. Amsden
1990	Daniel I. Axelrod
1991	Norman F. Sohl
1992	Malcolm C. McKenna
1993	Adolf Seilacher
1994	Walter C. Sweet
1995	Alfred G. Fischer
1996	James W. Valentine
1997	David M. Raup
1998	Allison R. Palmer
1999	Arthur J. Boucot
2000	Jack A. Wolfe
2001	Alan H. Cheetham
2002	Stephen Jay Gould
2003	Richard K. Bambach
2004	Martin A. Buzas
2005	Andrew H. Knoll
2006	Geerat J. Vermeij
2007	Steven M. Stanley
2008	Niles Eldredge
2009	Jeremy Jackson
2010	Bruce Runnegar
2011	Stig Bergström
2012	J. William Schopf
2013	Estella Leopold
2014	Erle Kauffman
2015	Derek Briggs
2016	Richard Fortey
2017	David Jablonski
2018	Kay Behrensmeyer
2019	David Bottjer
2020	Susan Kidwell

== See also ==
- List of paleontology awards
