= Charles Doolittle Walcott Medal =

Award by the National Academy of Sciences

- Awarded for: the encouragement and reward of individual achievement in advancing knowledge of Cambrian or Precambrian life and its history
- Country: United States
- Presented by: National Academy of Sciences
- First award: 1934
- Website: http://www.nasonline.org/about-nas/awards/early-earth-and-life-sciences.html

Charles Doolittle Walcott Medal is an award presented by the National Academy of Sciences every five years to promote research and study in the fields of Precambrian and Cambrian life and history.

The medal was established and endowed in 1934 by the Walcott Fund, a gift of Mary Vaux Walcott, in honor of paleontologist Charles Doolittle Walcott (1850–1927). The medal was sculpted by Laura Gardin Fraser.

Since 2008 the award has been linked to the Stanley Miller Medal and the two medals are now presented alternately, known collectively as the NAS Award in Early Earth and Life Sciences. Each medal is supplemented by a $10,000 award.

== Medalists ==
Source: NAS

- 1934 David White
- 1939 Anton H. Westergaard
- 1947 Alexander G. Vologdin
- 1952 Franco Rasetti
- 1957 Pierre Hupé
- 1962 Armin Öpik
- 1967 Allison R. Palmer
- 1972 Elso Sterrenberg Barghoorn
- 1977 Preston Cloud
- 1982 Martin Glaessner
- 1987 Andrew H. Knoll and Simon Conway Morris
- 1992 Stefan Bengtson
- 1997 Mikhail A. Fedonkin
- 2002 Hans J. Hofmann
- 2007 John Grotzinger
- 2013 J. William Schopf
- 2022 Mary Droser

== See also ==
- List of paleontology awards
