= Marquess of Oró =

Hereditary title of Spanish nobility

Marquessate of Oró
- Creation date: 23 June 2003
- Created by: Juan Carlos I
- First holder: Joan Oró
- Last holder: María Elena Oró
- Remainder to: Heirs of the body of the grantee
- Status: Extant

Marquess of Oró (Spanish: Marqués de Oró) is a hereditary title of Spanish nobility. It was created on 23 June 2003 by King Juan Carlos I in favor of Joan Oró, Spanish biochemist.

== List of Marquesses ==
- Joan Oró Florensa, 1st Marquess of Oró (2003–2004)
- María Elena Oró Forteza, 2nd Marchioness of Oró (2007– )
