= Oparin Medal =

Award

The Oparin/Urey Medal honours important contributions to the field of origins of life. The medal is awarded by the International Society for the Study of the Origin of Life (ISSOL). The award was originally named for Alexander Ivanovich Oparin, one of the pioneers in researching the origins of life. In 1993, the Society decided to alternate the name of the award so as to also honour the memory of Harold C. Urey, one of the first to propose the study of cosmochemistry.

== List of winners ==
The current list of medalists is shown below:

Oparin/Urey Medal Winners
Year	Name	Medal
1980	Cyril Ponnamperuma	Oparin
1983	Stanley Miller	Oparin
1986	Joan Oró	Oparin
1989	J. William Schopf	Oparin
1993	Leslie Orgel	Urey
1996	James Ferris	Oparin
1999	Alan Schwartz	Urey
2002	Albert Eschenmoser	Oparin
2005	Gerald Joyce	Urey
2008	James Kasting	Oparin
2011	Jack W. Szostak	Urey
2014	Andrew H. Knoll	Oparin
2017	none awarded	
2021	Donna Blackmond	Oparin
2023	Steven Benner	Urey
