= Allison R. Palmer =

American geologist (1927–2022)

- Born: January 9, 1927; Bound Brook, New Jersey, United States
- Died: October 22, 2022 (aged 95)
- Awards: Charles Doolittle Walcott Medal (1967); Paleontological Society Medal (1998)
- Scientific career
- Fields: Paleontology
- Workplaces: US Geological Survey Stony Brook University University of Colorado at Boulder

Allison Ralph (Pete) Palmer (January 9, 1927 – October 24, 2022) was an American paleontologist and geologist. His work focused on the Cambrian period. He had a career of nearly fifty years as a geologist with the United States Geological Survey and universities. The author of some 137 scientific articles, his research has been important in understanding of the origin and evolution of life on Earth. He was a member of the Unitarian Universalist Church of Boulder.

== Career ==
Palmer graduated from the Pennsylvania State University in 1946. He received his Ph.D. in geology from the Department of Geology and Geophysics at the University of Minnesota in 1950. Palmer spent a year with the Bureau of Economic Geology in Texas before starting his doctoral project mentored by William Charles “Charlie” Bell. He also met and married Pat Richardson and changed his research interests to the western USA. He then worked at the United States Geological Survey until 1966, where he studied the stratigraphy and paleontology of the Cambrian in the USA. There has been little significant work in this area since the 1920s. He and his collaborators spent two decades surveying, assessing and documenting rock formations with current methods to produce much better descriptions. This allowed him to introduce the concept of the biomere as a biostratigraphic unit to solve problems in using fossils to determine the age of rock and basin deposits in North America. He defined it as deposits bounded by noticeable non-evolutionary changes in fossils from a single phylum. They record repeated episodes of evolutionary diversification followed by extinctions. The concept has been influential and has since been used widely in assessing shoreline geological deposits. Others have documented biomeres in other geographic and geological regions.

From 1966 to 1980, he was professor of paleontology at the State University of New York at Stony Brook. He was on the board of the Faculty of Geosciences from 1974 to 1977. In 1980, Palmer left Stony Brook to become the centennial science program coordinator for the Geological Society of America in Boulder, Colorado. He was also the coordinator of educational programs from 1988 to 1991. He retired from the Geological Society of America in 1993 to become an adjunct professor at the University of Colorado at Boulder where he remained active in research.

== Awards and honors ==
He was a fellow of American Association for the Advancement of Science and was president of the Paleontological Society in 1983. In 1967 he received the Charles Doolittle Walcott Medal. Between 1972 and 1984 he was president of the Subcommittee for the Cambrian of the International Commission on Stratigraphy. He was a fellow of the Geological Society of America and received the 1992 Distinguished Service Medal. In 1998 he was awarded the Paelontological Society Medal.

== Publications ==
Palmer was author or co-author of over 137 publications. These include several major monographs. He was editor of the monumental “Decade of North American Geology" series, which was developed by the Geological Society of America and launched to mark its 100th anniversary in 1988. It describes the geology of North America in 30 volumes. He authored a revision of the most primitive group of Trilobites, the Olenellina, with Russian paleontologist L.N. Repina, that was the basis of the discussion of this group in the Treatise on Invertebrate Paleontology.
