= Elso Barghoorn =

American paleobotanist, professor

- Born: Elso Sterrenberg Barghoorn; June 30, 1915; New York City, NY, U.S.
- Died: January 22, 1984 (aged 68)
- Education: Miami University (BSc, MSc); Harvard University (PhD)
- Awards: F.V. Hayden Medal (1968); Charles Doolittle Walcott Medal (1972)
- Scientific career
- Fields: Paleobotany
- Workplaces: Amherst College; Harvard University
- Thesis: The ontogenetic development and phylogenetic specialization of rays in the xylem of conifers and dicotyledons (1941)
- Doctoral advisor: I. W. Bailey
- Doctoral students: Bruce H. Tiffney

Elso Sterrenberg Barghoorn (June 30, 1915 – January 22, 1984) was an American paleobotanist, called by his student Andrew Knoll, the present Fisher Professor of Natural History at Harvard, "the father of Pre-Cambrian palaeontology."

Barghoorn is best known for discovering in South African rocks fossil evidence of life that is at least 3.4 billion years old. These fossils show that life was present on Earth comparatively soon after the Late Heavy Bombardment (about 3.8 billion years ago).

Barghoorn was born in New York City. After graduating from Miami University with a BSc and an MSc in biology, Barghoorn obtained his Ph.D. in paleobotany from the Harvard University, faculty of biological sciences, in 1941. After teaching for five years at Amherst College, he joined the Harvard faculty, becoming Fisher Professor of Natural History and curator of the university's plant fossils collections. He was elected a Fellow of the American Academy of Arts and Sciences in 1950. In 1972 Barghoorn was awarded the Charles Doolittle Walcott Medal from the National Academy of Sciences, of which he was also a member. He was also a member of the National Academy of Sciences (1967) and the American Philosophical Society (1978). As a posthumous honor, the Paleontological Society established the Elso Barghoorn Student Research Award.

Barghoorn married Margaret Alden MacCleod in 1941, Teresa Joan LaCroix in 1953, and Dorothy Dellmer Osgood (1936–1982) in 1964. The first two marriages ended in divorce.

== Selected publications ==
- Tyler, Stanley A.; Barghoorn, Elso S. (1954). "Occurrence of Structurally Preserved Plants in Pre-Cambrian Rocks of the Canadian Shield". Science. 119 (3096): 606–608. Bibcode:1954Sci...119..606T. doi:10.1126/science.119.3096.606. PMID 17777442.
- Scott, Richard A.; Barghoorn, Elso S.; Leopold, Estella B. (1960). "How old are the angiosperms" (PDF). American Journal of Science. 258, Bradley Volume: 284–299.
- Kaye, Clifford A.; Barghoorn, Elso S. (1964). "Late Quaternary Sea-Level Change and Crustal Rise at Boston, Massachusetts, with Notes on the Autocompaction of Peat". Geological Society of America Bulletin. 75 (2): 63. doi:10.1130/0016-7606(1964)75[63:LQSCAC]2.0.CO;2. ISSN 0016-7606.
- Barghoorn, Elso S.; Tyler, Stanley A. (1965). "Microorganisms from the Gunflint Chert". Science. 147 (3658): 563–575. Bibcode:1965Sci...147..563B. doi:10.1126/science.147.3658.563. PMID 17783259.
- Barghoorn, Elso S.; Schopf, J. William (1965). "Microorganisms from the Late Precambrian of Central Australia". Science. 150 (3694): 337–339. Bibcode:1965Sci...150..337B. doi:10.1126/science.150.3694.337. PMID 17742361. S2CID 22110392.
- Barghoorn, Elso S.; Schopf, J. William (1966). "Microorganisms Three Billion Years Old from the Precambrian of South Africa". Science. 152 (3723): 758–763. Bibcode:1966Sci...152..758B. doi:10.1126/science.152.3723.758. PMID 17797444. S2CID 26997945.
- Emery, K. O.; Wigley, R. L.; Bartlett, Alexandra S.; Rubin, Meyer; Barghoorn, E. S. (1967). "Freshwater Peat on the Continental Shelf". Science. 158 (3806): 1301–1307. Bibcode:1967Sci...158.1301E. doi:10.1126/science.158.3806.1301. PMID 17801856. S2CID 37415558.
- Schopf, J. W.; Kvenvolden, K. A.; Barghoorn, E. S. (1968). "Amino acids in Precambrian sediments: An assay". Proceedings of the National Academy of Sciences. 59 (2): 639–646. Bibcode:1968PNAS...59..639S. doi:10.1073/pnas.59.2.639. PMC 224720. PMID 5238992.
- Knoll, Andrew H.; Barghoorn, Elso S. (1974). "Ambient Pyrite in Precambrian Chert: New Evidence and a Theory". Proceedings of the National Academy of Sciences. 71 (6): 2329–2331. Bibcode:1974PNAS...71.2329K. doi:10.1073/pnas.71.6.2329. PMC 388446. PMID 16592159.
- Knoll, Andrew H.; Barghoorn, Elso S.; Golubić, Stjepko (1975). "Paleopleurocapsa wopfnerii gen. Et sp. Nov.: A Late Precambrian alga and its modern counterpart". Proceedings of the National Academy of Sciences. 72 (7): 2488–2492. Bibcode:1975PNAS...72.2488K. doi:10.1073/pnas.72.7.2488. PMC 432792. PMID 16592257.
- Leo, Richard F.; Barghoorn, Elso S. (1976). "Silicification of Wood". Botanical Museum Leaflets, Harvard University. 25 (1): 1–47. doi:10.5962/p.295209. JSTOR 41762773.
- Awramik, S.M.; Margulis, L.; Barghoorn, E.S. (1976). "Chapter 4.4 Evolutionary Processes in the Formation of Stromatolites". Stromatolites. Developments in Sedimentology. Vol. 20. pp. 149–162. doi:10.1016/S0070-4571(08)71135-X. ISBN 9780444413765.
- Knoll, Andrew H.; Barghoorn, Elso S. (1977). "Archean Microfossils Showing Cell Division from the Swaziland System of South Africa". Science. 198 (4315): 396–398. Bibcode:1977Sci...198..396K. doi:10.1126/science.198.4315.396. PMID 17809440.
- Walters, Clifford C.; Margulis, Lynn; Barghoorn, Elso S. (1977). "On the experimental silicification of microorganisms. I. Microbial growth on organosilicon compounds". Precambrian Research. 5 (3): 241–248. Bibcode:1977PreR....5..241W. doi:10.1016/0301-9268(77)90031-6.
- Francis, S.; Margulis, L.; Barghoorn, E.S. (1978). "On the experimental silicification of microorganisms II. On the time of appearance of eukaryotic organisms in the fossil record". Precambrian Research. 6 (1): 65–100. Bibcode:1978PreR....6...65F. doi:10.1016/0301-9268(78)90055-4.
- Francis, Susan; Barghoorn, Elso S.; Margulis, Lynn (1978). "On the experimental silicification of microorganisms. III. Implications of the preservation of the green prokaryotic alga prochloron and other coccoids for interpretation of the microbial fossil record". Precambrian Research. 7 (4): 377–383. Bibcode:1978PreR....7..377F. doi:10.1016/0301-9268(78)90048-7.
