= Andrew H. Knoll =

American paleontologist

Andrew Knoll
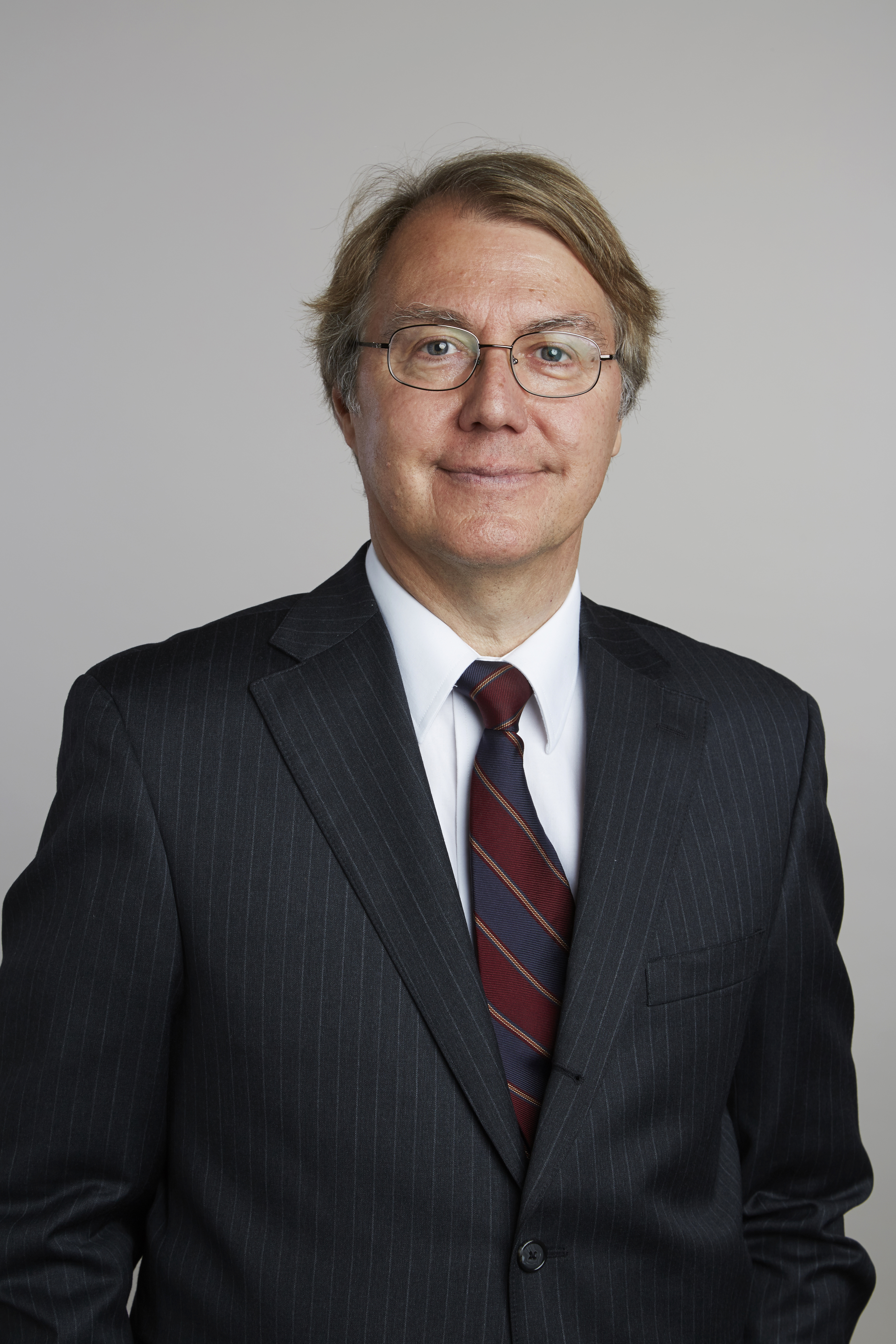
- Born: April 23, 1951 (age 75); West Reading, Pennsylvania, US
- Occupations: Paleontologist, botanist, geologist, biologist
- Awards: Guggenheim Fellowship; Charles Doolittle Walcott Medal (1987); Raymond C. Moore Medal (2005); Mary Clark Thompson Medal (2012); International Prize for Biology (planetary science, United States, 2018); Foreign Member of the Royal Society (2015, 2015); Wollaston Medal (2007); Crafoord Prize in Geosciences (2022)
- Scientific career
- Thesis: Studies in Archean and early Proterozoic paleontology (1977)
- Notable students: Nicholas Tosca
- Website: eps.harvard.edu/people/andrew-h-knoll

Andrew Herbert Knoll (born 1951) is an American paleontologist and paleobotanist, who is the Fisher Research Professor of Natural History and of Earth and Planetary Sciences, Emeritus, at Harvard University. Born in West Reading, Pennsylvania, in 1951, Andrew Knoll graduated from Lehigh University with a Bachelor of Arts in 1973 and received his Ph.D. from Harvard University in 1977 for a dissertation titled "Studies in Archean and Early Proterozoic Paleontology." Knoll taught at Oberlin College for five years before returning to Harvard in 1982 and teaching there until 2022. At Harvard, he served in the departments of Organismic and Evolutionary Biology and Earth and Planetary Sciences.

== Scientific work ==
Andrew Knoll is best known for his contributions to Precambrian paleontology and biogeochemistry. He has discovered microfossil records of early life in Spitsbergen, East Greenland, Siberia, China, Namibia, western North America, and Australia, and was among the first to apply principles of taphonomy and paleoecology to their interpretation. He has also elucidated early records of skeletonized animals in Namibia and remarkable fossils of the Ediacaran Doushantuo Formation, China, preserved in exceptional cellular detail by early diagenetic phosphate precipitation. Knoll and colleagues authored the first paper to demonstrate strong stratigraphic variation in the carbon isotopic composition of carbonates and organic matter preserved in Neoproterozoic (1000–539 million years ago) sedimentary rocks, and Knoll's group also demonstrated that mid-Proterozoic carbonates display little isotopic variation through time, in contrast to both older and younger successions.

Knoll has longstanding interests in biomineralization, paleobotany, plankton evolution, and mass extinction. Among other things, Knoll and his colleagues were the first to hypothesize that rapid build-up of carbon dioxide played a key role in end-Permian mass extinction, 252 million years ago. More generally, Knoll uses physiology as a conceptual bridge to integrate geochemical records of environmental change with paleontological records of biological history. He has also served as a member of the science team for NASA's MER rover mission to Mars.

Honors include membership in the US National Academy of Sciences, the American Academy of Arts and Sciences, the American Philosophical Society, the American Academy of Microbiology, and Foreign Membership in the Royal Society of London and the National Academy of Sciences, India, as well as the Paleontological Society Medal, the Wollaston Medal of the Geological Society (London), the Moore Medal of the Society for Sedimentary Geology, the Oparin Medal of the International Society for the Study of the Origin of Life, the Sven Berggren Prize of the Royal Physiographic Society, Sweden, the Penrose Medal of the Geological Society of America, the Garrels Award of the Geobiology Society, and both the Walcott and Thompson medals of the US National Academy of Sciences. He received the Phi Beta Kappa Book Award for "Life on a Young Planet: The First Three Billion Years of Evolution on Earth". In 2018, Knoll received the International Prize for Biology, conferred in Tokyo in the presence of the Emperor and Empress of Japan. In 2022, he received the Crafoord Prize in Geosciences.

=== Knoll criterion ===
In astrobiology, the Knoll criterion says that "to be evidence of life, an observation has to not just be explicable by biology; it has to be inexplicable without it".

== Books ==
- 2004 – Life on a Young Planet: The First Three Billion Years of Evolution on Earth. Princeton University Press, Princeton NJ, 277 pp., ISBN 978-0-691-12029-4
- 2007 – The Evolution of Primary Producers in the Sea. Falkowski, P. and A.H. Knoll, Eds. Elsevier, Burlington MA, 441 pp., ISBN 978-0-12-370518-1
- 2012 – Fundamentals of Geobiology. Knoll, A.H., D.E. Canfield and K. Konhauser, Eds. Wiley-Blackwell, Chichester UK, 443 pp., ISBN 978-1-4051-8752-7
- 2013 – Biology: How Life Works. Morris, J., D. Hartl, A.H. Knoll, R. Lue, and others. Macmillan. 2nd Edition 2016: ISBN 978-1-319-06779-3; 4th Edition 2022.
- 2021 – A Brief History of Earth: Four Billion Years in Eight Chapters. Knoll, A.H. Custom House, New York NY, 272 pp., ISBN 978-0-06-285391-2
- 2026 – Earth and Life: A Four Billion Year Conversation. Princeton University Press. ISBN 978-0-691-18223-0

== Selected papers ==
- Knoll, Andrew H.; Carroll, Sean B. (25 June 1999). "Early Animal Evolution: Emerging Views from Comparative Biology and Geology". Science. 284 (5423). American Association for the Advancement of Science (AAAS): 2129–2137. doi:10.1126/science.284.5423.2129. ISSN 0036-8075. PMID 10381872.
- Anbar, A. D.; Knoll, A. H. (16 August 2002). "Proterozoic Ocean Chemistry and Evolution: A Bioinorganic Bridge?". Science. 297 (5584). American Association for the Advancement of Science (AAAS): 1137–1142. Bibcode:2002Sci...297.1137A. doi:10.1126/science.1069651. ISSN 0036-8075. PMID 12183619. S2CID 5578019.
- Knoll, Andrew H.; Walter, Malcolm R.; Narbonne, Guy M.; Christie-Blick, Nicholas (30 July 2004). "A New Period for the Geologic Time Scale". Science. 305 (5684). American Association for the Advancement of Science (AAAS): 621–622. doi:10.1126/science.1098803. ISSN 0036-8075. PMID 15286353. S2CID 32763298.
- Knoll, A.H; Javaux, E.J; Hewitt, D; Cohen, P (5 May 2006). "Eukaryotic organisms in Proterozoic oceans". Philosophical Transactions of the Royal Society B: Biological Sciences. 361 (1470). The Royal Society: 1023–1038. Bibcode:2006PTRSB.361.1023K. doi:10.1098/rstb.2006.1843. ISSN 0962-8436. PMC 1578724. PMID 16754612.
- Tomitani, Akiko; Knoll, Andrew H.; Cavanaugh, Colleen M.; Ohno, Terufumi (4 April 2006). "The evolutionary diversification of cyanobacteria: Molecular–phylogenetic and paleontological perspectives". Proceedings of the National Academy of Sciences. 103 (14): 5442–5447. Bibcode:2006PNAS..103.5442T. doi:10.1073/pnas.0600999103. ISSN 0027-8424. PMC 1459374. PMID 16569695.
- Knoll, Andrew H.; Bambach, Richard K.; Payne, Jonathan L.; Pruss, Sara; Fischer, Woodward W. (2007). "Paleophysiology and end-Permian mass extinction". Earth and Planetary Science Letters. 256 (3–4). Elsevier BV: 295–313. Bibcode:2007E&PSL.256..295K. doi:10.1016/j.epsl.2007.02.018. ISSN 0012-821X.
- Wilson, Jonathan P.; Knoll, Andrew H.; Holbrook, N. Michele; Marshall, Charles R. (2008). "Modeling fluid flow in Medullosa, an anatomically unusual Carboniferous seed plant". Paleobiology. 34 (4). Cambridge University Press (CUP): 472–493. Bibcode:2008Pbio...34..472W. doi:10.1666/07076.1. ISSN 0094-8373. S2CID 54194897.
- Tosca, Nicholas J.; Knoll, Andrew H.; McLennan, Scott M. (30 May 2008). "Water Activity and the Challenge for Life on Early Mars". Science. 320 (5880). American Association for the Advancement of Science (AAAS): 1204–1207. Bibcode:2008Sci...320.1204T. doi:10.1126/science.1155432. ISSN 0036-8075. PMID 18511686. S2CID 27253871.
- Tosca, Nicholas J.; Knoll, Andrew H. (2009). "Juvenile chemical sediments and the long term persistence of water at the surface of Mars". Earth and Planetary Science Letters. 286 (3–4). Elsevier BV: 379–386. Bibcode:2009E&PSL.286..379T. doi:10.1016/j.epsl.2009.07.004. ISSN 0012-821X. S2CID 39532723.
- Knoll, Andrew H. (30 May 2011). "The Multiple Origins of Complex Multicellularity". Annual Review of Earth and Planetary Sciences. 39 (1): 217–239. Bibcode:2011AREPS..39..217K. doi:10.1146/annurev.earth.031208.100209. ISSN 0084-6597.
- Knoll, Andrew H.; Fischer, Woodward W. (15 September 2011). "Skeletons and Ocean Chemistry: The Long View". Ocean Acidification. Oxford University Press. doi:10.1093/oso/9780199591091.003.0009. ISBN 978-0-19-959109-1.
- Parfrey, Laura Wegener; Lahr, Daniel J. G.; Knoll, Andrew H.; Katz, Laura A. (2 August 2011). "Estimating the timing of early eukaryotic diversification with multigene molecular clocks". Proceedings of the National Academy of Sciences. 108 (33): 13624–13629. Bibcode:2011PNAS..10813624P. doi:10.1073/pnas.1110633108. ISSN 0027-8424. PMC 3158185. PMID 21810989.
- Cohen, Phoebe A.; Knoll, Andrew H. (2012). "Scale microfossils from the mid-Neoproterozoic Fifteenmile Group, Yukon Territory". Journal of Paleontology. 86 (5). Cambridge University Press (CUP): 775–800. Bibcode:2012JPal...86..775C. doi:10.1666/11-138.1. ISSN 0022-3360. S2CID 131120053.
- Knoll, Andrew H. (10 August 2012). "Systems paleobiology". Geological Society of America Bulletin. 125 (1–2). Geological Society of America: 3–13. doi:10.1130/b30685.1. ISSN 0016-7606.
- Bosak, Tanja; Knoll, Andrew H.; Petroff, Alexander P. (30 May 2013). "The Meaning of Stromatolites". Annual Review of Earth and Planetary Sciences. 41 (1). Annual Reviews: 21–44. Bibcode:2013AREPS..41...21B. doi:10.1146/annurev-earth-042711-105327. ISSN 0084-6597.
- Sperling, E.A., C.A. Frieder, P.R. Girguis, A.V. Raman, L.A. Levin, and A.H. Knoll (2013) Oxygen, ecology, and the Cambrian radiation of animals. Proceedings of the National Academy of Sciences, USA 110: 13446–13451.
- Knoll, A. H. (1 January 2014). "Paleobiological Perspectives on Early Eukaryotic Evolution". Cold Spring Harbor Perspectives in Biology. 6 (1) a016121. Cold Spring Harbor Laboratory. Bibcode:2014CSHPB...616121K. doi:10.1101/cshperspect.a016121. ISSN 1943-0264. PMC 3941219. PMID 24384569.
- Sperling, Erik A.; Knoll, Andrew H.; Girguis, Peter R. (4 December 2015). "The Ecological Physiology of Earth's Second Oxygen Revolution". Annual Review of Ecology, Evolution, and Systematics. 46 (1). Annual Reviews: 215–235. Bibcode:2015AREES..46..215S. doi:10.1146/annurev-ecolsys-110512-135808. ISSN 1543-592X. S2CID 8606044.
- Knoll, Andrew H.; Follows, Michael J. (26 October 2016). "A bottom-up perspective on ecosystem change in Mesozoic oceans". Proceedings of the Royal Society B: Biological Sciences. 283 (1841) 20161755. The Royal Society. Bibcode:2016PBioS.28361755K. doi:10.1098/rspb.2016.1755. ISSN 0962-8452. PMC 5095382. PMID 27798303.
- Knoll, Andrew H.; Bergmann, Kristin D.; Strauss, Justin V. (5 November 2016). "Life: the first two billion years". Philosophical Transactions of the Royal Society B: Biological Sciences. 371 (1707) 20150493. The Royal Society. Bibcode:2016PTRSB.37150493K. doi:10.1098/rstb.2015.0493. ISSN 0962-8436. PMC 5052739. PMID 27672146. S2CID 17286885.
- Knoll, Andrew H.; Nowak, Martin A. (5 May 2017). "The timetable of evolution". Science Advances. 3 (5) e1603076. American Association for the Advancement of Science (AAAS). Bibcode:2017SciA....3E3076K. doi:10.1126/sciadv.1603076. ISSN 2375-2548. PMC 5435417. PMID 28560344.
- Muscente, A. D.; Prabhu, Anirudh; Zhong, Hao; Eleish, Ahmed; Meyer, Michael B.; Fox, Peter; Hazen, Robert M.; Knoll, Andrew H. (23 April 2018). "Quantifying ecological impacts of mass extinctions with network analysis of fossil communities". Proceedings of the National Academy of Sciences. 115 (20): 5217–5222. Bibcode:2018PNAS..115.5217M. doi:10.1073/pnas.1719976115. ISSN 0027-8424. PMC 5960297. PMID 29686079.
- Gilbert, Pupa U. P. A.; Porter, Susannah M.; Sun, Chang-Yu; Xiao, Shuhai; Gibson, Brandt M.; Shenkar, Noa; Knoll, Andrew H. (19 August 2019). "Biomineralization by particle attachment in early animals". Proceedings of the National Academy of Sciences. 116 (36): 17659–17665. Bibcode:2019PNAS..11617659G. doi:10.1073/pnas.1902273116. ISSN 0027-8424. PMC 6731633. PMID 31427519.
- Laakso, Thomas A.; Sperling, Erik A.; Johnston, David T.; Knoll, Andrew H. (18 May 2020). "Ediacaran reorganization of the marine phosphorus cycle". Proceedings of the National Academy of Sciences. 117 (22): 11961–11967. Bibcode:2020PNAS..11711961L. doi:10.1073/pnas.1916738117. ISSN 0027-8424. PMC 7275700. PMID 32424088.
- Wordsworth, Robin; Knoll, Andrew H.; Hurowitz, Joel; Baum, Mark; Ehlmann, Bethany L.; Head, James W.; Steakley, Kathryn (2021). "A coupled model of episodic warming, oxidation and geochemical transitions on early Mars". Nature Geoscience. 14 (3). Springer Science and Business Media LLC: 127–132. arXiv:2103.06736. Bibcode:2021NatGe..14..127W. doi:10.1038/s41561-021-00701-8. ISSN 1752-0894. S2CID 263788799.
- Gilbert, Pupa U. P. A.; Bergmann, Kristin D.; Boekelheide, Nicholas; Tambutté, Sylvie; Mass, Tali; Marin, Frédéric; Adkins, Jess F.; Erez, Jonathan; Gilbert, Benjamin; Knutson, Vanessa; Cantine, Marjorie; Hernández, Javier Ortega; Knoll, Andrew H. (11 March 2022). "Biomineralization: Integrating mechanism and evolutionary history". Science Advances. 8 (10) eabl9653. Bibcode:2022SciA....8L9653G. doi:10.1126/sciadv.abl9653. ISSN 2375-2548. PMC 8906573. PMID 35263127.
- Miao, Lanyun; Yin, Zongjun; Knoll, Andrew H.; Qu, Yuangao; Zhu, Maoyan (26 January 2024). "1.63-billion-year-old multicellular eukaryotes from the Chuanlinggou Formation in North China". Science Advances. 10 (4) eadk3208. Bibcode:2024SciA...10K3208M. doi:10.1126/sciadv.adk3208. ISSN 2375-2548. PMC 10807817. PMID 38266082.

== Honors ==
- 1967 – Eagle Scout
- 1987 – awarded Charles Schuchert Award, presented to a promising paleontologist under 40
- 1987 – awarded Walcott Medal for contributions to the study of Precambrian life, in particular the microbial roots of plant evolution
- 1996 – awarded honorary doctorate from Uppsala University, Sweden
- 1998 – awarded honorary doctorate from Lehigh University
- 2003 – awarded Phi Beta Kappa Book Award in Science for Life on a Young Planet
- 2005 – awarded Paleontological Society Medal
- 2005 – awarded Raymond C. Moore Medal
- 2007 – awarded Wollaston Medal , the highest award granted by the Geological Society of London; previous recipients include Charles Darwin and Louis Agassiz
- 2012 – awarded Thompson Medal for meritorious research in paleontology and geology
- 2013 – foreign fellow, National Academy of Sciences, India
- 2014 – awarded honorary doctorate from the University of Chicago
- 2014 – awarded the Oparin Medal from the International Society for the Study of the Origin of Life
- 2014 – awarded honorary doctorate from the University of Southern Denmark
- 2015 – elected a Foreign Member, Royal Society (ForMemRS) of London
- 2017 – awarded honorary doctorate from the American Museum of Natural History
- 2018 – awarded the Sven Berggren Prize, Royal Physiographic Society, Sweden
- 2018 – awarded the Geological Society of America's Geobiology and Geomicrobiology Division Award
- 2018 – awarded the International Prize for Biology
- 2022 – awarded the Crafoord Prize
- 2024 – awarded the Penrose Medal of the Geological Society of America
- 2025 – awarded the Garrels Award of the Geobiology Society
