= Raymond Cecil Moore =

American paleontologist

Raymond Cecil Moore (February 20, 1892, Roslyn, Washington – April 16, 1974, Lawrence, Kansas) was an American geologist and paleontologist. He is known for his work on Paleozoic crinoids, bryozoans, and corals. Moore was a member of US Geological Survey from 1913 until 1949. In 1919 he became professor at the University of Kansas (Lawrence). In 1953 Professor Moore organized the launch and became the first editor of the still ongoing multi-volume work Treatise on Invertebrate Paleontology. Contributors to the Treatise have included the world's specialists in the field. He served as president of the Geological Society of America in 1958. In 1970 he was awarded the Mary Clark Thompson Medal from the National Academy of Sciences.

== Early life ==
Moore was raised in Kansas, Missouri, Wisconsin and Illinois. After attending high school in Milwaukee and Chicago, he enrolled in Denison University, taking his A.B. degree. He took his PhD at the University of Chicago in 1916, under the supervision of Stuart Weller. His dissertation was the stratigraphy of the Mississippian System of Missouri.

== Early career ==
Moore commenced work as an Assistant Professor in geology at the University of Kansas in 1916. He became state geologist and director of the Geological Survey of Kansas. He married Georgine Watters in Chicago in 1917. In 1920, he was promoted to full Professor. He would alternate in his role of state geologist/director of the Geological Survey for 38 years, performing double duty as Professor for 23 of those years. After commencing work in Kansas he made the decision to analyse Permian-Pennsylvanian stratigraphy of the Midcontinent. He studied sedimentary units from Nebraska, Iowa and Missouri, as far as Oklahoma. He specialised on genetic stratigraphy, which would become cyclic sedimentation and sequence stratigraphy in modern study.

Moore and his wife Georgine divorced in 1935. Their daughter Marjorie Ann Moore had been born in 1928. Moore married Lilian Boggs in St Louis, Missouri in 1936. In addition to his stratigraphic work, Moore was able to define and clarify his findings by identifying their unique fossil signatures. He studied oil and gas resources up to the Precambrian period, as well as igneous intrusives in several counties within Kansas. His maps of the state are still distributed by the Kansas Geological Survey today. Moore also developed a uniform stratigraphic code for the Midcontinent. He expanded into the area of facies. He used ecological communities (ecosystems) to help understand cyclothems. As his work developed a stratigraphic and sedimentological framework, he turned his attention to invertebrate paleontology, working on corals, crinoids, gastropods and bryozoans. After serving in the Army during World War II, Moore moved on to teach advanced courses such as “Field Stratigraphy” and “Geologic Development of the World” in the late 1940s.

== Treatise on Invertebrate Paleontology ==
Following his war service, Moore began work on a project which was pitched to the University of Kansas, Kansas Geological Survey and the National Science Foundation, which would become the Treatise on Invertebrate Paleontology. With planning beginning in 1953, Moore drafted a project where specialists would write on their area of expertise in paleontology to a multi volume series. This international team of experts would provide the manuscripts, which would be published by the University of Kansas Press. Moore became the editor, and also supervised the dedications, introductions, definition of morphologic terms, as well as other explanations. He supplied the parts to the Treatise which concerned his own specialty areas. In the introduction to Part A of “Fossilization” (1979) a dedication to Moore as the founder of the Treatise was published. It also features a pen-and-ink sketch of him by his former student Roger Williams. As volumes of the Treatise were completed up until 1966 these were published by the Geological Society of America and the University of Kansas Press. After 1966, new volumes of the ongoing work were published by the Geological Society of America and the University of Kansas. The Treatise continues to this day, and new volumes are published online. The Paleontological Institute of the University of Kansas became the sole publisher of the series in 2009.

== Later career ==
In 1958, Moore was appointed as a Solen E. Summerfield Distinguished Professor. This distinguished him as one of the leading professors of the university. He would go on to supervise many student theses and dissertations, a large number of them studying Kansas subjects. Many of these students went on to teach at major universities or distinguish themselves within their respective industries. Fluent in a number of languages, Moore was able to make use of international literature and expected his students to be similarly conversant with non-English literature.

== Memberships ==
- President of the Society of Economic Paleontologists and Mineralogists (1928– 1929)
- President of the American Association of State Geologists (1936–1937)
- President of the Paleontological Society (1947–1949)
- President of the Society of Systematic Zoology (1957–1958)
- President of the Geological Society of America (1957–1958)
- President of the American Geological Institute (1959–1960)
- Editor - Bulletin of the American Association of Petroleum Geologists (1920–1926)
- Editor - Journal of Paleontology (1930–1939)
- Editor - Journal of Sedimentary Petrology (1931–1936)
- Editor - Kansas Paleontogical Contributions

== Legacy and awards ==
In his later years, ill health confined Moore to his bed, while he continued revisions of the Treatise. He died in Kansas in 1974. Moore was survived by his wife Lillian, and daughter Marjorie Ann Snave.

The main Kansas Geological Survey building on the University's west campus was named for Moore in 1973. He received the non-alumnus Distinguished Service Citation from University of Kansas in 1970. Moore received an honorary doctorate from his Denison University in 1935. He received the F.V. Hayden Medal from the Philadelphia Academy of Natural Sciences in 1956. He also received the Sidney Powers Medal from the American Association of Petroleum Geologists in 1956. He received the first conferred Paleontological Society Medal in 1963. Moore was honored with the Prix Paul Fourmarier Gold Medal from the Académie Royale de Belgique in 1966. In 1968, he received the Wollaston Medal from the Geological Society of London in 1968. Moore was honoured with the Mary Clark Thompson Medal of the National Academy of Science in 1970 and the first Twenhofel Medal from SEPM (the Society for Sedimentary Geology) in 1972. Each year, the Moore Medal is presented in his honor by SEPM for excellence in paleontology.

Moore designed the G-Hawk, the symbol of geology at KU. The ancestor of the G-Hawk was Jayhawkornis kansasensis, which Moore illustrated and promoted, was featured in the 1954 comic strip Pogo.

== Selected bibliography ==
- Historical Geology. New York: McGraw-Hill. 1933 – via Internet Archive.
- Introduction to Historical Geology (2nd ed.). New York: McGraw-Hill. 1958 – via Internet Archive.
- Moore, Raymond Cecil; Laudon, Lowell Robert (1943). Evolution and Classification of Paleozoic Crinoids. Geological Society of America – via Internet Archive.
- Moore, Raymond C.; Lalicker, Cecil G.; Fischer, Alfred G. (1952). Invertebrate Fossils. New York: McGraw-Hill – via Internet Archive.
- Founder & First Editor, Treatise on Invertebrate Paleontology, Boulder, Colorado, The Geological Society of America & Lawrence, Kansas, University of Kansas Press, 1953 - work-in-progress.
- Introduction to Historical Geology (2nd ed.). New York: McGraw-Hill. 1958 – via Internet Archive.
