= Carl Owen Dunbar =

American paleontologist

Carl Owen Dunbar (January 1, 1891 – April 7, 1979) was an American paleontologist who specialized in invertebrate fossils. He was a Professor of Geology at Yale University from 1920 until 1959. He was also Director of the Peabody Museum of Natural History at Yale University from 1942 until 1959. As editor of a textbook series on historical geology from the 1920s through the 1950s, his work was published and sold in over 1 million books.

== Early life ==
Dunbar was born 1 January 1891 in Hallowell, Cherokee County, Kansas. He was raised on his grandfather, Warder Dunbar’s ranch by his parents David Dunbar (1863–1941) and mother Emma Thomas Dunbar (née McNeil).

Dunbar enrolled at the University of Kansas in 1909 and finished his doctorate at Yale University in 1917. His dissertation was entitled, “The Paleontology and Stratigraphy of the Devonian of Western Tennessee.” His doctoral advisor was Yale paleontologist, Charles Schuchert.

== Geology at Yale University & Peabody Museum of Natural History ==
Between 1918 and 1920, Dunbar taught geology at the University of Minnesota. In 1920, when Charles Schuchert retired from his professorship at Yale University, he recommended Dunbar as his replacement. Dunbar taught at Yale University from 1920 to 1959.

Dunbar was a worldwide expert on the evolution of fusulines during the Pennsylvanian and Permian periods of the late Paleozoic age. In 1927, his work, published with G. E. Condra, is considered the first definitive study on fusulinids and Foraminifera. Dunbar published a series of textbooks at Yale University on historical geology. These books "dominated the field through the 1920s and 1930s and made a major contribution to professional education in earth science." At the end of his career, Dunbar’s textbooks had sold close to a million copies.

Dunbar is also notable for his seventeen years as the Director of the Peabody Museum of Natural History at Yale University. Dunbar and his predecessor A. E. Parr were responsible overseeing Rudolph Zallinger and his work on one hundred-foot mural of the Age of Reptiles, a project that earned Zallinger a Pulitzer Prize.

Dunbar was elected to the American Philosophical Society in 1942, U.S. National Academy of Sciences in 1944, American Academy of Arts and Sciences in 1950. In 1946, Dunbar was selected by The National Academy of Sciences as one of a twenty-man committee of civilian scientists to observe Operation Crossroads, the atom bomb tests at Bikini atoll. He was made an honorary member of the Geological Society of Mexico in 1944, a corresponding fellow of the Geological Society of London in 1950, and an honorary life member of the Society of Economic Paleontologists and Mineralogists in 1965. He received the Hayden Memorial Geological Medal of the Academy of Natural Sciences in 1959, the Paleontological Society Medal in 1967, and the William H. Twenhofel Medal of the Society of Sedimentary Geology in 1978.

== Cited works ==
- “Carl Owen Dunbar,” History and Archives, Peabody Museum of Natural History, Yale University. (retrieved 4 February 2011)
- Dunbar, C. O. (1966). The earth. Cleveland: World Pub. Co.
- Dunbar, C. O. (1960). Historical geology. New York: Wiley.
- Dunbar, C. O. & C. Schuchert (1937) Outlines of Historical Geology, 3d ed. New York: Wiley.
- Dunbar, C. O. & C. Schuchert (1940). A textbook of geology: Part II: Historical geology. New York: Wiley.
- Rodgers, John. “Carl Owen Dunbar, 1891-1979,” Washington, D.C.: National Academy of Sciences, 1985. ([retrieved 8 October 2016)
