= PALAIOS =

- Discipline: Paleontology, Geology
- Language: English

Publication details
- History: 1986–present
- Publisher: Society for Sedimentary Geology (United States)
- Frequency: Bimonthly

Standard abbreviations
- ISO 4: PALAIOS

Indexing
- CODEN: PALAEM
- ISSN: 0883-1351 (print); 1938-5323 (web)
- LCCN: sn85007551
- OCLC no.: 48388903

Links
- Journal homepage; GeoScienceWorld access

PALAIOS is a bimonthly academic journal dedicated to the study of the impact of life on Earth history, combining the fields of palaeontology and sedimentology. It has been published by the Society for Sedimentary Geology since its inception in 1986. Although not an acronym, the title PALAIOS is capitalized.
