= Biogeology =

Study of the interactions between the Earth's biosphere and the lithosphere

Biogeology is the study of the interactions between the Earth's biosphere and the lithosphere.

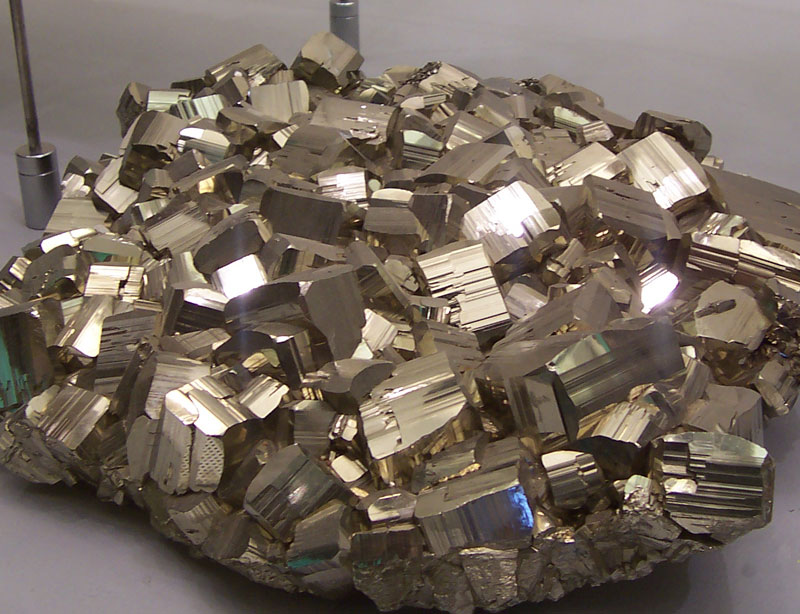
Pyrite

Biogeology examines biotic, hydrologic, and terrestrial systems in relation to each other, to help understand the Earth's climate, oceans, and other effects on geologic systems.

For example, bacteria are responsible for the formation of some minerals such as pyrite, and can concentrate economically important metals such as tin and uranium. Bacteria are also responsible for the chemical composition of the atmosphere, which affects weathering rates of rocks.

Prior to the late Devonian period, there was little plant life beyond lichens, and bryophytes. At this time large vascular plants evolved, growing up to 30 meters (98 ft 5.1 in) in height. These large plants changed the atmosphere, and altered the composition of the soil by increasing the amount of organic carbon. This helped prevent the soil being washed away through erosion.

== See also ==
- Pedology
- Geobiology
