= G. Arthur Cooper =

American paleobiologist (1902–2000)

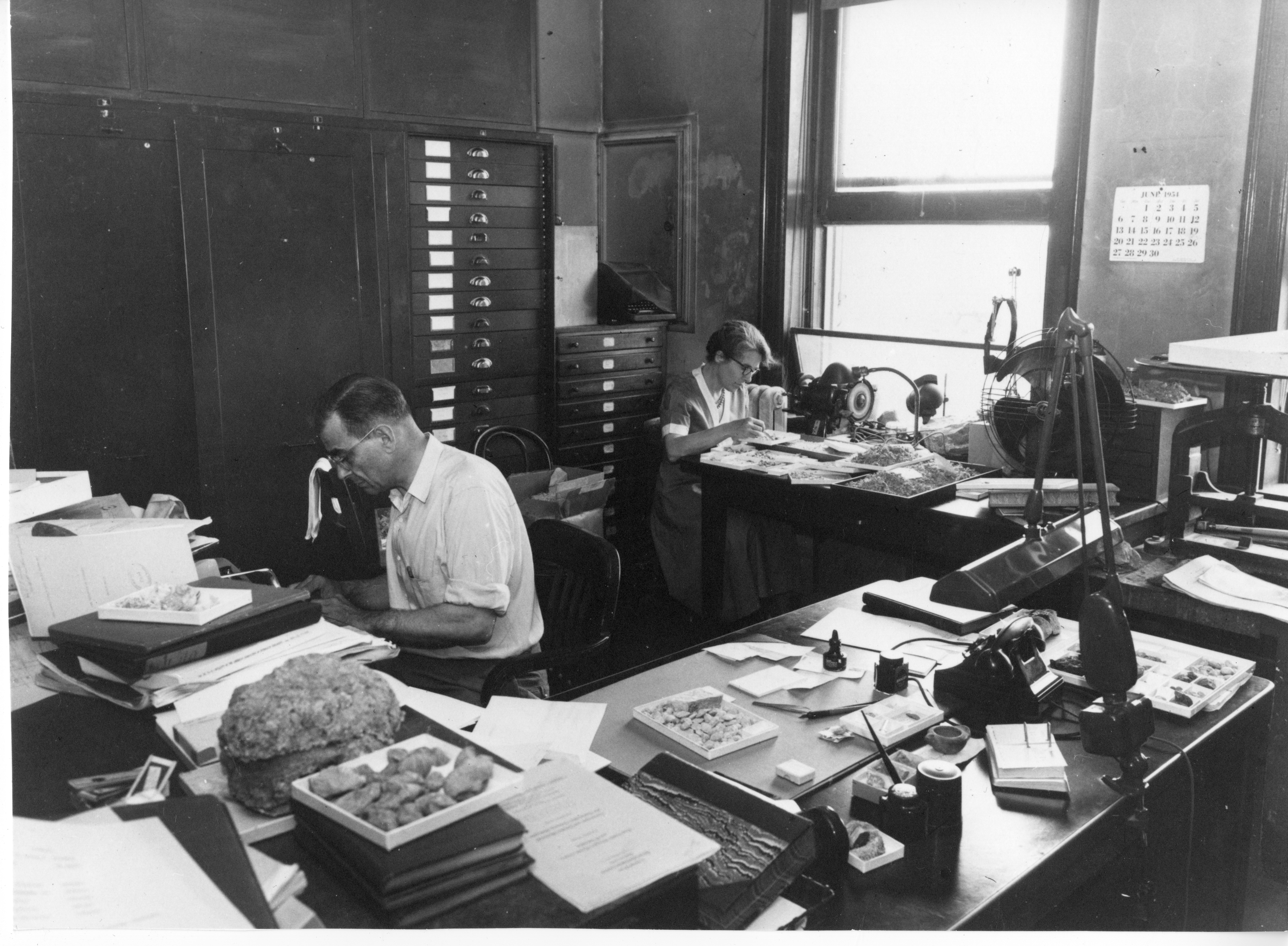
- Born: Gustav Arthur Cooper; February 9, 1902; College Point, Queens, New York
- Died: October 17, 2000 (aged 98); Raleigh, North Carolina
- Education: Colgate University; Yale University
- Spouse: Josephine W. Cooper
- Awards: Mary Clark Thompson Medal (1957); Paleontological Society Medal (1964); Daniel Giraud Elliot Medal (1979); Penrose Medal (1983)
- Scientific career
- Fields: Paleobiology
- Workplaces: Smithsonian Institution

Gustav Arthur Cooper (February 9, 1902 – October 17, 2000) was an American paleobiologist.

Cooper was born in College Point, Queens, and attended Colgate University. He graduated in 1924, staying on to receive a master's degree in 1926. He then attended Yale University, where he received his PhD in 1929. His dissertation was titled, "Stratigraphy of the Hamilton Group of New York."

He met his future wife, Josephine Wells, while they were both studying geology at Yale. They married in 1930 and moved to Washington, D.C.

In 1930, he got a job as assistant curator at the Division of Stratigraphic Paleontology in United States National Museum. He was promoted to a curator position in 1944 for the Division of Invertebrate Paleontology. In 1957, he became the head curator of the Department of Geology, and 6 years later became the chairman of the newly formed Department of Paleobiology. He became senior paleobiologist in 1967, after which he devoted his life to research. He retired in 1974 with paleobiologist emeritus title. He died in 2000.
