= Society for Sedimentary Geology =

Non-profit scientific society

The Society for Sedimentary Geology is an international not-for-profit, scientific society based in the US state of Oklahoma. It is commonly referred to by its acronym SEPM, which refers to its former name, the Society of Economic Paleontologists and Mineralogists.

The society's reason for being is to disseminate scientific information on sedimentology, stratigraphy, paleontology, environmental sciences, marine geology, hydrogeology, and related specialties. Members benefit from both gaining and exchanging information pertinent to their geologic specialties. Information is dispersed via the publication of two major scientific journals, the Journal of Sedimentary Research (JSR) and PALAIOS, and the organization of technical conferences and short courses. It also publishes a monthly magazine for its members, The Sedimentary Record, which is now a diamond open access journal.

== Conferences ==
The society arranges research conferences based on topics that are relevant to members and show promise of progress. They are meant to focus the attention of specialists with diverse expertise on some theme of mutual interest and stimulate new research areas or approaches. They are designed to encourage summaries of new, incomplete research, and invite open speculation. Field trips, poster sessions, core workshops, and laboratory experiments are often included as part of a conference.

== Awards ==
Annually the society recognizes people who have contributed to the various areas of sedimentary geology. The awardees are nominated by members of the society, but do not have to be members themselves. These medals are named in recognition of outstanding geologists.

- William H. Twenhofel Medal, the highest award, for outstanding contributions to sedimentary geology, named for William H. Twenhofel
- Francis P. Shepard Medal for marine geology, named for Francis Shepard
- Raymond C. Moore Medal for paleontology, named for Raymond C. Moore
- Francis J. Pettijohn Medal for sedimentology, named for Francis J. Pettijohn
- William Dickenson Medal for an impactful mid-career sedimentary geoscientist, named for William Dickenson
- James Lee Wilson Award for sedimentary geology by a young scientist, named for James Lee Wilson

The society also bestows, at its discretion, honorary membership and a distinguished service award to society members.
