= List of presidents of the Paleontological Society =

This is a list of all the past and present presidents of the Paleontological Society.

- 1909 John Mason Clarke
- 1910 Charles Schuchert
- 1911 William Berryman Scott
- 1912 David White
- 1913 Charles D. Walcott
- 1914 Henry Fairfield Osborn
- 1915 Edward Oscar Ulrich
- 1916 Rudolf Ruedemann
- 1917 John Campbell Merriam
- 1918 Frank Hall Knowlton
- 1919 Robert Tracy Jackson
- 1920 Frederic Brewster Loomis
- 1921 Timothy W. Stanton
- 1922 William Diller Matthew
- 1923 T. Wayland Vaughan
- 1924 Edward Wilber Berry
- 1925 Richard Swann Lull
- 1926 Stuart Weller
- 1927 William Arthur Parks
- 1928 August F. Foerste
- 1929 Ermine Cowles Case
- 1930 William H. Twenhofel
- 1931 Edgar Roscoe Cumings
- 1932 Ray S. Bassler
- 1933 Edward Martin Kindle
- 1934 Percy Edward Raymond
- 1935 Charles Kephart Swartz
- 1936 Gilbert Dennison Harris
- 1937 Joseph Augustine Cushman
- 1938 Charles W. Gilmore
- 1939 Ralph W. Chaney
- 1940 Carl O. Dunbar
- 1941 Lloyd William Stephenson
- 1942 Elias Howard Sellards
- 1943 John B. Reeside, Jr.
- 1944 Benjamin Franklin Howell
- 1945 Chester Stock
- 1946 James Brookes Knight
- 1947 Raymond C. Moore
- 1948 Wendell P. Woodring
- 1949 Winifred Goldring
- 1950 Charles Edwin Weaver
- 1951 Harold Ernest Vokes
- 1952 Julia A. Gardner
- 1953 William Storrs Cole
- 1954 Harry Stephen Ladd
- 1955 Alfred Scott Warthin Jr.
- 1957 G. Arthur Cooper
- 1958 Arthur K. Miller
- 1959 Frank M. Swartz
- 1960 Kenneth Edward Caster
- 1961 Norman D. Newell
- 1962 John W. Wells
- 1963 S. W. Muller
- 1964 Ralph Willard Imlay
- 1965 Harry B. Whittington
- 1966 John Wyatt Durham
- 1967 Erwin Charles Stumm
- 1968 Alan Bosworth Shaw
- 1969 Digby J. McLaren
- 1970 William H. Easton
- 1971 Bernhard Kummel
- 1972 Curt Teichert
- 1973 Porter M. Kier
- 1974 James W. Valentine
- 1975 William A. Oliver, Jr.
- 1976 Ellis L. Yochelson
- 1977 David M. Raup
- 1978 Frank G. Stehli
- 1979 Richard E. Grant
- 1980 Warren O. Addicott
- 1981 Arthur J. Boucot
- 1982 Erle G. Kauffman
- 1983 A. R. (Pete) Palmer
- 1984 Walter C. Sweet
- 1985 Helen Tappan Loeblich
- 1986 Norman F. Sohl
- 1987 Stephen J. Gould
- 1988 N. Gary Lane
- 1989 Brian F. Glenister
- 1990 John Pojeta, Jr.
- 1991 Thomas E. Bolton
- 1992 Roger L. Kaesler
- 1993 Rodney M. Feldmann
- 1994 Steven M. Stanley
- 1995 Craig Call Black
- 1996 J. John Sepkoski, Jr.
- 1997 Jere H. Lipps
- 1998 Karl W. Flessa
- 1999 Peter H. Crane
- 2001 Patricia H. Kelley
- 2003 William I. Ausich
- 2005 David Bottjer
- 2007 Derek E. G. Briggs
- 2009 Douglas H. Erwin
- 2011 Philip D. Gingerich
- 2013 Sandra J. Carlson
- 2015 Steven M. Holland
- 2017 Arnold I. Miller
- 2019 Bruce J. MacFadden
- 2021 William DiMichele (Current Past-President)
- 2023 Anne Raymond (Current President)
- 2025 Rowan Lockwood (Current President-Elect)

== Gallery ==
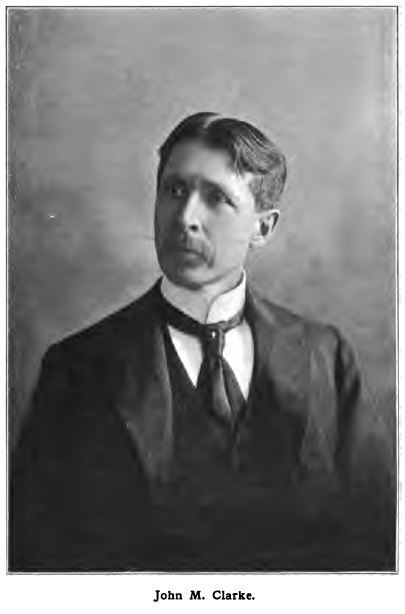
John Mason Clarke

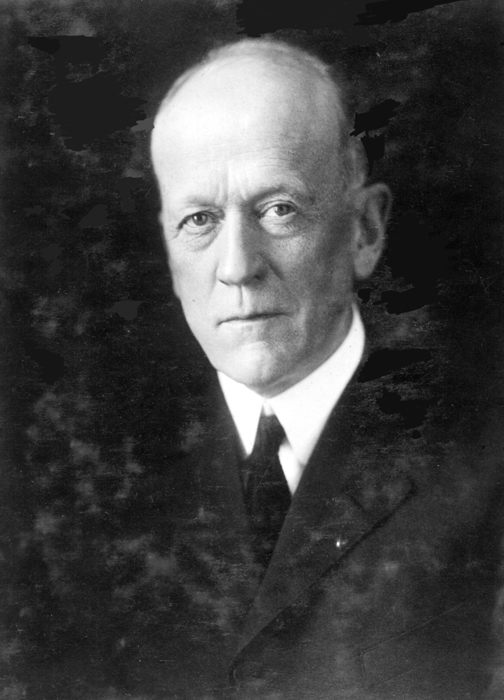
Charles D. Walcott

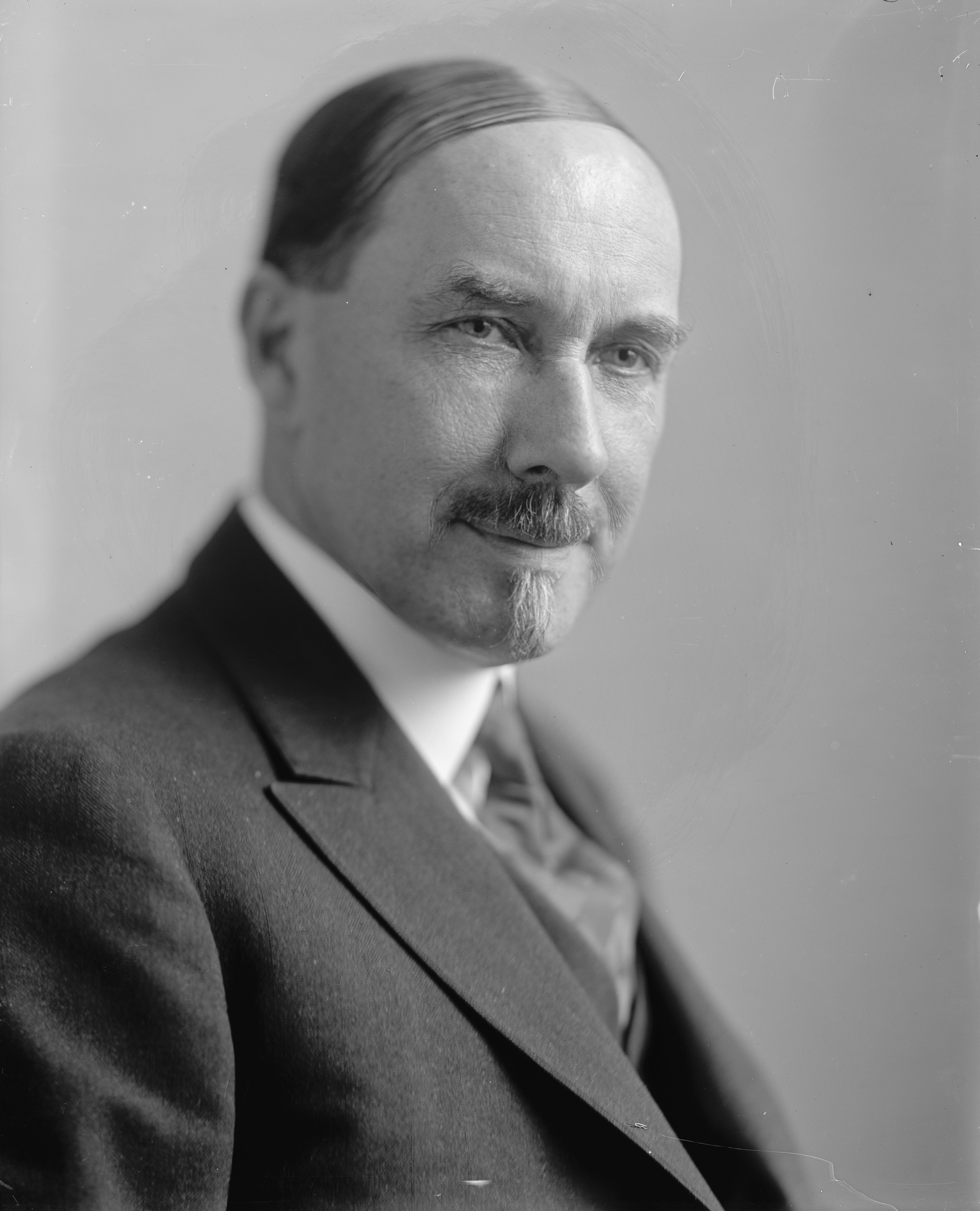
John Campbell Merriam

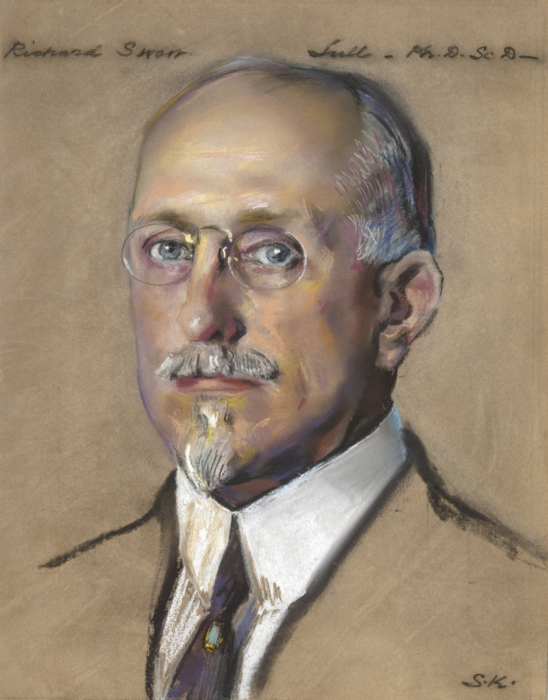
Richard Swann Lull

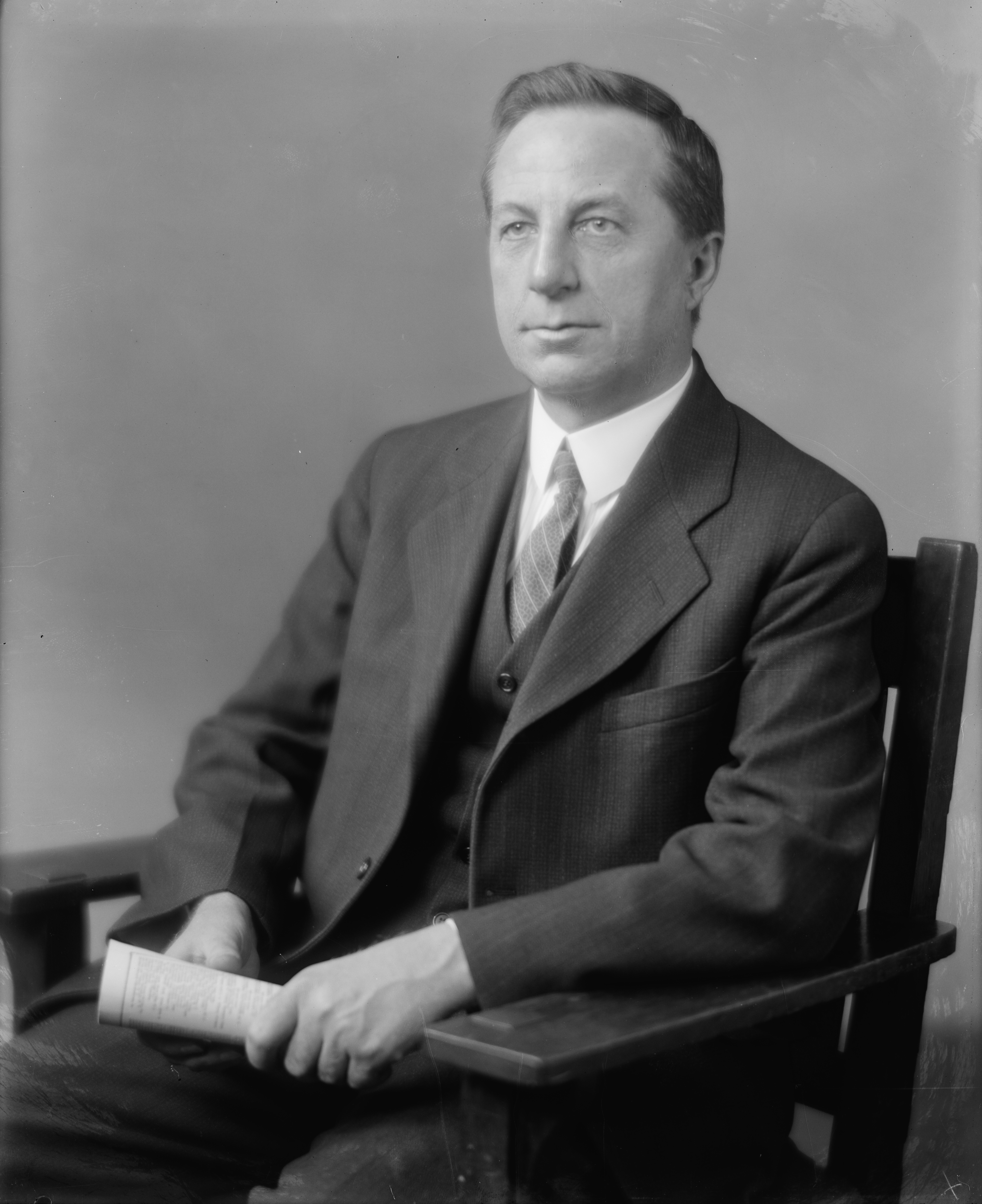
Ray S. Bassler

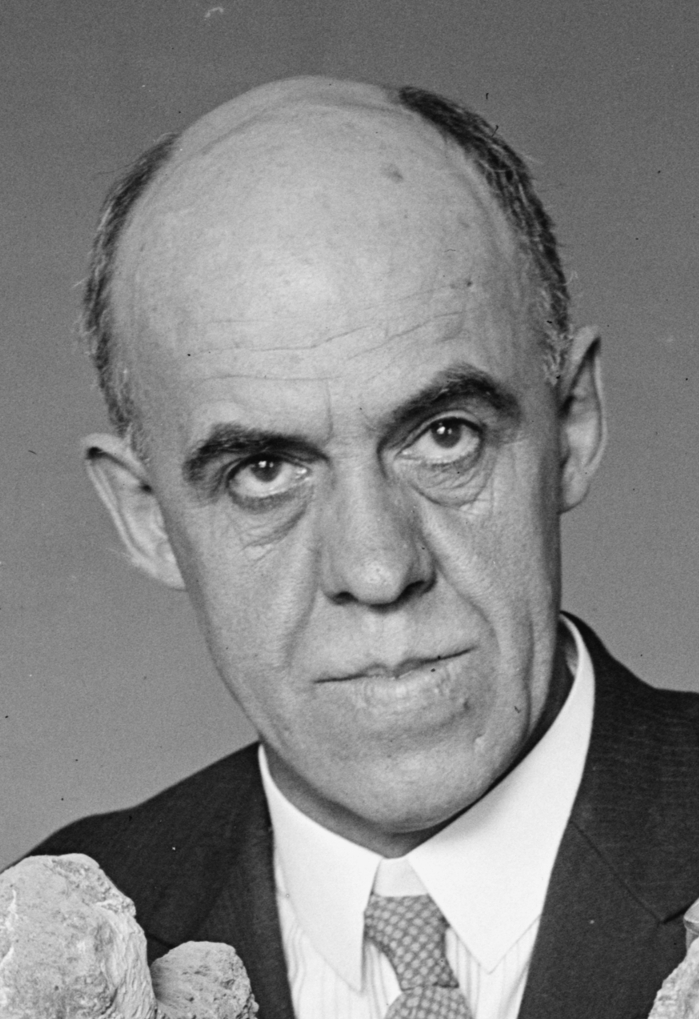
Charles W. Gilmore

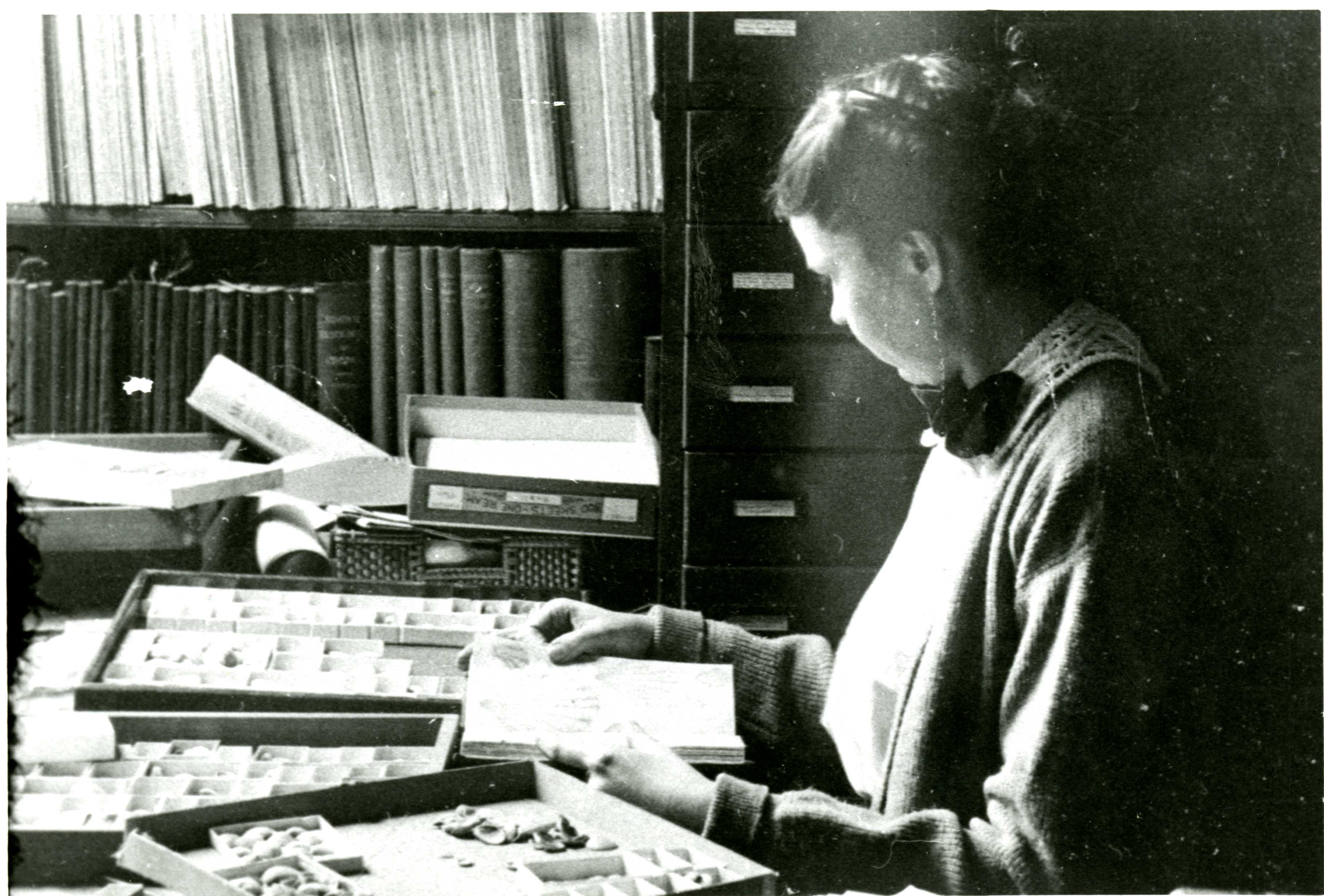
Julia Anna Gardner

Steven M. Holland
