= Lipp =

Family name

Lipp may refer to:

- Alina Lipp, German pro-Russian propagandist
- Eliot Lipp (born 1980), American electronic music artist
- Maria Lipp (1892–1966), German organic chemist
- Heino Lipp (1922–2006), Estonian decathlete and shot putter
- Marko Lipp (born 1999), Estonian footballer
- Martin Lipp (1854–1923), Estonian poet
- Oskar Lipp (born 1995), German politician
- Robert I. Lipp, American businessman
- Tom Lipp (1870–1932), American baseball player
- Wilma Lipp (1925–2019), Austrian operatic soprano

== See also ==
- Lexikon der indogermanischen Partikeln und Pronominalstämme (LIPP, "Lexicon of the Indo-European Particles and Pronominal Stems"), an etymological dictionary
- Brasserie Lipp, a café in Paris
- Lipps (disambiguation)
