= Peter J. Wagner =

American paleontologist

- Born: 27 September 1964 (age 61); United States
- Education: BS University of Michigan; MS Michigan State University; PhD University of Chicago
- Awards: Charles Schuchert Award (2004)
- Scientific career
- Fields: Paleontology; Paleobiology
- Workplaces: Smithsonian National Museum of Natural History; University of Nebraska–Lincoln

Peter J. Wagner (born 27 September 1964) is a paleontologist at the University of Nebraska–Lincoln. He received his Ph.D. in Geophysical Sciences from The University of Chicago in 1995, conducted postdoctoral research at the Smithsonian Institution, served as a curator at the Field Museum of Natural History from 1996 through 2007, and was at the Smithsonian Institution from 2007 through 2017. He was given the Charles Schuchert Award of the Paleontological Society in 2004. His research focuses on macroevolution and paleoecology, especially as regards the systematics, evolutionary dynamics, morphology, and distribution of Paleozoic Molluscs. He has published extensively in such journals as Paleobiology, Systematic Biology, and Science and is a contributor to the Paleobiology Database.

== Bibliography ==
- Wagner P. J. 2002. Phylogenetic relationships of the earliest anisostrophically coiled gastropods. Smithsonian Contributions to Paleobiology, 88: 152 pp.
