= Rowan Lockwood =

American paleobiologist

Rowan Lockwood is an American paleobiologist specializing in environmental change and the ecology of fossil marine invertebrates. She is professor of geology at the College of William & Mary, where she was awarded the university’s Jefferson Teaching Award in 2009. Lockwood has served as the president-elect of the Paleontological Society since 2024.

Lockwood is from Rockford, Illinois and attended the Illinois Mathematics and Science Academy. She earned a B.A. in biology and organismal biology, cum laude, from Yale College. In 1993, Lockwood won a Rhodes Scholarship and Marshall Scholarship. She declined the former and completed a M.Sc. from the University of Bristol as a Marshall Scholar. She earned a Ph.D. in evolutionary biology at the University of Chicago. Her 2001 dissertation was titled Extinction and Rebound: Evolutionary Patterns in Late Cretaceous and Cenozoic Bivalves. Her committee included David Jablonski, Michael LaBarbera, Michael Foote, Barry Chemoff, and Jack Sepkoski.
