= Shuhai Xiao =

Paleontologist and professor

- Education: Peking University; Harvard University
- Awards: Member, National Academy of Sciences 2023
- Scientific career
- Fields: Paleontology, Paleobiology, Geology, Geobiology
- Workplaces: Virginia Tech, Tulane University
- Doctoral advisor: Andrew H. Knoll
- Website: https://geos.vt.edu/people/Everyone/Shuhai-Xiao.html

Shuhai Xiao is a paleontologist and professor of geobiology at Virginia Tech, Blacksburg, Virginia, U.S.A.

== Early life ==
Xiao attended Taihe Middle School in Jiangxi Province, China. He received a B.Sc. degree and an M.Sc. degree from Peking University in 1988 and 1991, both in geology. He then worked as an assistant researcher in the Nanjing Institute of Geology and Palaeontology, Chinese Academy of Sciences, for two years. He earned a Ph.D. degree in Organismic and Evolutionary Biology from Harvard University in 1998.

== Career ==
Xiao worked as a Postdoctoral Fellow at Harvard University in 1998–2000 and an assistant professor in the Department of Geology at Tulane University in 2000–2003. In 2003, he moved to Virginia Tech, serving as an Assistant Professor (2003–2005), Associate Professor (2005–2008), and Full Professor (2008–present) in the department of Geosciences. From 2012 to 2020, Xiao served as the chair of the Subcommission on Ediacaran Stratigraphy, International Commission on Stratigraphy. Xiao was elected to the National Academy of Sciences (NAS) in 2023.

== Research ==
Xiao studies the interactions between the biosphere and its environment during key transition periods in Earth's history, particularly the Ediacaran-Cambrian transition. He has published extensively on Ediacaran stratigraphy and paleobiology in South China, particularly the Doushantuo, Lantian, and Dengying formations. He is interested in Precambrian microbial world, the fossil record of eukaryotes, multicellular algae, the Ediacara biota, the early evolution of animals, and exceptional fossil preservation.

== Awards and honors ==
- 2023, ICS Medalist, International Commission on Stratigraphy
- 2023, Member, Virginia Academy of Science, Engineering, and Medicine
- 2023, Member, National Academy of Sciences
- 2021, NAS Award in the Evolution of Earth and Life - Mary Clark Thompson Medal
- 2019, Fellow, American Association for the Advancement of Science (AAAS)
- 2019, Patricia Caldwell Faculty Fellow, College of Science, Virginia Tech
- 2017, Virginia Outstanding Scientist Award
- 2016, Visiting Scholarship, Phi Beta Kappa Society
- 2015, Fellow, Geological Society of America
- 2010, Guggenheim Fellowship
- 2010, Virginia Tech Alumni Award for Excellence in Research
- 2007, Fellow, Paleontological Society
- 2006, Paleontological Society Charles Schuchert Award
