= Susan M. Kidwell =

American paleontologist and geologist

- Born: United States
- Education: BS College of William & Mary; MS, PhD Yale University
- Awards: Charles Schuchert Award; Mary Clark Thompson Medal
- Scientific career
- Fields: Paleontology; Paleobiology; Geology
- Workplaces: University of Chicago

Susan M. Kidwell is an American paleontologist and geologist at the University of Chicago. Her research has focused on the relationships between fossil concentrations and sequence stratigraphy, experimental taphonomy, and the implications of the very recent fossil record for understanding modern ecological changes.

== Education and career ==
Kidwell was educated at the College of William & Mary, where she earned her Bachelor of Science degree in 1976. She completed her graduate studies in geology at Yale University, receiving her Ph.D. in 1982. She was an assistant professor at the University of Arizona 1981 until 1985, before joining the faculty at the University of Chicago. She became associate professor in 1988 and professor in 1994.

== Research ==
Susan Kidwell's research focuses on the formation of the fossil record. Early in her career, she explored the close connection between the formation of dense fossil concentrations and sequence stratigraphy. Her studies demonstrated the importance of slow sedimentation rates in allowing fossil remains to be concentrated. Subsequently, she was one of the pioneers in the field of experimental taphonomy, used to understand how recently dead organisms are preserved in the fossil record. Currently, Kidwell's research emphasizes how very young fossil records, that is, remains that are currently or recently accumulating on the seafloor or the land, can be used to understand how human activities have affected ecosystems.

== Awards ==
In 1995, Kidwell received the Charles Schuchert Award, which is given by the Paleontological Society to persons under 40 "whose work reflects excellence and promise in paleontology". In 1999 she received the Quantrell Award for Undergraduate Teaching from the University of Chicago. In 2002, she was named a Fellow of the American Academy of Arts & Sciences, and in 2003, she was appointed William Rainey Harper Professor by the University of Chicago. In 2011 Kidwell was named a Fellow of the American Association for the Advancement of Science. In 2015 she received the Mary Clark Thompson Medal from the United States National Academy of Sciences "for most important service to geology and paleontology". In 2017 she received the Raymond C. Moore Medal for Paleontology from the Society for Sedimentary Geology in recognition of "Excellence in Paleontology".

== Selected works ==
=== Articles ===
- Kidwell, Susan M.; Flessa, Karl W. (1995). "The Quality of the Fossil Record: Populations, Species, and Communities". Annual Review of Ecology and Systematics. 26 (1): 269–299. Bibcode:1995AnRES..26..269K. doi:10.1146/annurev.es.26.110195.001413. ISSN 0066-4162. JSTOR 2097208. (with Karl W. Flessa)
- Kidwell, Susan M.; Holland, Steven M. (2002). "The Quality of the Fossil Record: Implications for Evolutionary Analyses". Annual Review of Ecology and Systematics. 33 (1): 561–588. Bibcode:2002AnRES..33..561K. doi:10.1146/annurev.ecolsys.33.030602.152151. ISSN 0066-4162. JSTOR 3069273. (with Steven M. Holland)
- Tomašových, Adam; Kidwell, Susan M. (2017). "Nineteenth-century collapse of a benthic marine ecosystem on the open continental shelf". Proceedings: Biological Sciences. 284 (1856): 1–9. doi:10.1098/rspb.2017.0328. ISSN 0962-8452. JSTOR 44683448. PMC 5474068. PMID 28592668. (with Adam Tomašových)
