= Lipps =

Lipps may refer to:

- Lipps, Virginia
- Lipps Island
- Lipps Inc

Lipps is a surname. Notable people with the surname include:

- Jere H. Lipps
- Louis Lipps
- Theodor Lipps
