= Sandra J. Carlson =

American invertebrate paleontologist

Sandra J. Carlson is an American invertebrate paleontologist specialized in brachiopods. She is a professor emerita in the department of earth and planetary sciences at the University of California, Davis. She was president of the Paleontological Society in 2013.

Carlson completed a B.S. in earth sciences from the University of California, Santa Cruz. She completed a M.S. and Ph.D. in geological sciences (paleontology) from the University of Michigan. Her 1986 dissertation was titled, Ontogenetic and Evolutionary Trends in the Articulate Brachiopod Hinge Mechanism. Daniel Fisher was Carlson's doctoral advisor.
