= Emiliano Mutti =

Italian geologist (born 1933)

- Born: 1933 (age 92–93); Gozzano, Italy
- Spouse: Edda Pasquali
- Children: 2
- Awards: Twenhofel Medal (2004)

Academic background
- Education: University of Milan; University of Torino

Academic work
- Discipline: Geologist
- Sub-discipline: Siliciclastic sedimentology Petroleum geosciences Sedimentary geology
- Institutions: University of Milan; Esso; University of Turin; University of Ferrara; University of Parma

Emiliano Mutti (born 1933, Gozzano) is a geologist and sedimentologist who has made significant contributions to petroleum geosciences, especially to sedimentary dynamics of turbidites and their reservoir characterisation. He was a professor at University of Parma for 25 years (1982—2007) and served as the chair for the geology department. He previously worked at the University of Milan (1960—1965), University of Turin (1969—1979), and University of Ferrara (1979—1981), as well as for companies including Esso (1965—1969) and YPF (1980s).

== Biography ==
Mutti was born in 1933 in Gozzano near Lake Orta, where his parents, Ido and Natalina, had settled temporarily for work. His father was the first person to graduate in industrial chemistry in Italy. Mutti also has a sister, Alba. After his birth, the family moved to Milan, where they remained for Mutti's primary and secondary education. After Milan was bombed in 1942, they moved to the small town Nociveglia, Bedonia, where their ancestors had lived since at least the 19th century. In the Northern Apennines, Mutti was surrounded by rocks and trees, sparking his love for the outdoors. He later returned to the valley to study the turbidites and deep-water depositional systems.

Mutti spent three years in medical school at his father's urging, eventually leaving the field to pursue geology. After the death of his father, Mutti spent a year working as a sales technician for Minnesota Mining and Manufacturing Company before receiving a scholarship to attend University of Milan. He received his master's degree in geological sciences in 1959 with a thesis on the stratigraphy and structure of Tertiary Macigno turbidites in the Northern Apennines. He remained at the institution as an assistant professor of sedimentology from 1960 to 1965. In 1965, he received a scholarship from NATO to study at the University of Utrecht, after which he was recruited by Esso to work in their production lab in Bordeaux. There, he met American geologist C. V. "Chuck" Campbell, who took him to the United States for further geological study. They did extensive field research there, as well as in Italy, Greece, Argentina, and Indonesia. Mutti still considers Campbell his main mentor, one who "transformed [him] as a professional."

In 1969, Mutti left Esso to become an associate professor of sedimentology at the University of Turin. In 1971, he earned his PhD with a thesis on cartography, sedimentology, and stratigraphy in the Isle of Rhodes. In 1975, he became a full professor at Turin. During his time there, he began conducting research in the south tertiary pyrenean basin in the Spanish Pyrenees. In 1972, he and Franco Ricci Lucchi published the article Le turbidity dell'Apenino Settentrionale: introduzione all'analisi di faces in the Proceedings of the Italian Geological Society. This was quickly translated by a US Geological Service researcher, Tor H. Nilsen, for the International Geology Review. Several years later, in 1978, the translation was republished as a report by the American Geological Institute. Mutti left Turin in 1979 and spent a few years as a full professor of geology at University of Ferrara. In the 1980s, he began working as a consultant for YPF in Argentina, particularly in the Neuquén Basin. In 1982, he accepted a position as professor of geology at the University of Parma, where he remained until retiring in 2007. At the time of his retirement, he was chair of Parma's geology department.

Since 1989, his work has focused on stratigraphy and facies analysis of flood-dominated fluvio-deltaic deposits and their relationships to turbidite systems in many tectonically mobile basins worldwide. Between 1989 and 1998, he organised and led a field course in Argentina titled "Turbidite systems and facies and their relations to depositional sequences" for AAPG. In 1994, he and Henry W. Posamentier organised the second High-resolution Sequence Stratigraphy Conference. His "study of deep-water clastics on present-day continental margins by reflection seismic, led to comprehensive models of clastic sedimentary systems that became the first predictive models for subsurface geologists. [His] turbidite system model...[and] the methodology of how the model was constructed, is today widely used. Petroleum exploration companies have applied his model with great success." As of 2016, he was working with the Brazilian company Petrobras.

During his academic career, Mutti supervised 49 undergraduate theses, 19 doctoral theses, and 22 research fellowships. He also sat on a number of professional and academic boards, including as National Coordinator of the Sedimentology Group for the Consiglio Nazionale della Ricerca (1975—1978, 1988—1991); member of the Stratigraphy and Cartography Commission of the Consiglio Nazionale della Ricerca (1985—1990); Principal Coordinator and Head of the MURST Project on sedimentary basin analysis; member of the scientific committee of the Eni Prize; and Vice President of the International Association of Sedimentologists and concurrently a member of its editorial board (1978—1982). Mutti is known for carrying a sketchpad and camera into the field to create images and diagrams of what he encounters. These have been included in a number of his articles and books.

== Personal life ==
Mutti met his wife Edda Pasquali in Bobbio while working on his master's thesis. The couple have two children, Maria and Luigi, and live in a house in Nociveglia that Mutti's grandfather built around 1850. In addition to his native tongue, Mutti is fluent in English, Spanish, French, and Portuguese.

== Awards ==
Year	Award	Awarding body	Notes	Ref
1985	Distinguished Lecturer	American Association of Petroleum Geologists	Presentation: "Turbidite Systems: Models and Problems"	
1992	Silver Medal	City of Tremp		
1992	Corresponding Member	Argentine Geological Association	"For his contributions to the knowledge of sedimentology and stratigraphy in the Argentine geological community."	
1993	Honorary Member	Geological Society of London	At the time, the only Italian geologist to be appointed	
1996	Distinguished Lecturer	American Association of Petroleum Geologists	Presentation: "Turbidite systems and their relations to catastrophic fluvial sedimentation"	
1996	Special Lecturer	International Association of Sedimentologists	Presentations: "Facies analysis of turbine systems" and "Flood-generated sandstone facies in ancient flood-dominated fluvio-deltaic systems"	
1997	Special Commendation	American Association of Petroleum Geologists	"For a lifetime dedicated to the study of stratigraphy and deepwater reservoirs, and in recognition of his knowledge and experience for the benefit of petroleum geologists and the global scientific community."	
2003	Wegener Prize	European Association of Geoscientists and Engineers	"For his worldwide contribution to sedimentary dynamics of turbides and their reservoir characterization."	
2004	Twenhofel Medal	Society for Sedimentary Geology	Excellence in sedimentary geology	
2011	Honorary Member	Italian Geological Society		
2012	Jean Baptiste Lamarck Medal	European Geosciences Union	For "research on clastic sedimentology, especially his...detailed field-based models of turbidite systems, their petroleum reservoir characterisation and to fluvio-deltaic systems."	
2016	Eni Award in Renewable Energy	Eni	For "His lifelong commitment... in the study of turbidites and contourites."	

== Selected publications ==
He has written over 100 scientific papers and books on sedimentology, stratigraphy, and turbidite systems.

Articles

- Ghibaudo, G.; Morelli, E.; Mutti, E.; Obrador, A.; Pons, J.; Ramasco, M.; Rosell, J. (1973). "Osservazioni sedimentologiche preliminari sulle Arenarie di Aren (Cretacico superiore) tra Isona e il Rio Noguera Ribagorzana (Prepirenei spagnoli)". Italian Journal of Geosciences (in Italian). 92 (3): 529–540.
- Crumeyrolle, P.; Mutti, E. (1986). "Stratigraphie et sédimentologie des systèmes de dépôt de plate-forme de la séquence de Santa Liestra (bassin éocène sud-pyrénéen, province de Huesca, Espagne)". Comptes rendus de l'Académie des Sciences (in French). 303 (II-7): 581–584.
- Zavala, C.; Mutti, E. (October 1996). "Stratigraphy of the Plio-Pleistocene Sant'Arcangelo basin, Basilicata, Italy". Proceedings of Riunione annuale del Gruppo Informale di Sedimentologia: 279–282.
- Tinterri, R.; Drago, M.; Consonni, A.; Davoli, G.; Mutti, E. (Summer 2003). "Modelling subaqueous bipartite sediment gravity flows on the basis of outcrop constraints: first results". Marine and Petroleum Geology. 20 (6–8): 911–933. doi:10.1016/j.marpetgeo.2003.03.003.
- Mutti, E.; Bernoulli, D.; Ricci Lucchi, F.; Tinterri, R. (January 2009). "Turbidites and turbidity currents from Alpine 'flysch'to the exploration of continental margins". Sedimentology. 56 (1): 267–318. doi:10.1111/j.1365-3091.2008.01019.x.
- Ogata, K.; Pini, G. A.; Tinterri, R.; Mutti, E. (2012). "Mass transport processes and related deformation mechanisms in sedimentary mélanges". Società Geologica Italiana. 22: 158–161.
- Mutti, E. (15 December 2019). "Thin-bedded plumites: an overlooked deep-water deposit". Journal of Mediterranean Earth Sciences. 11: 61–80. doi:10.3304/JMES.2019.005.
- Fonnesu, M.; Mutti, E. (2022). "High-resolution sequence stratigraphy and facies assemblage in flood-dominated and mixed deltaic systems: Insights from early Eocene Figols Group, South-central Pyrenean basin". Sedimentary Geology. 439: 1–18. doi:10.1016/j.sedgeo.2022.106213.

Books

- Mutti, E. (1969). Sedimentologia delle Arenarie di Messanagros (Oligocene-Aquitaniano) nell' isola di Rodi (in Italian). Pisa: Arti Grafiche Pacini Mariotti. OCLC 799513056.
- Mutti, E.; Ricci Lucchi, F. (1978). Turbidites of the Northern Apennines: Introduction to Facies Analysis. Translated by Nilsen, T. H. American Geological Institute. ISBN 978-091-331-218-6.
- Mutti, E. (1985). "Turbidite systems and their relations to depositional sequences". In Zuffa, G. G (ed.). Provenance of Arenites. Nato Sciences Series C. Vol. 148. D. Reidel Publishing Company. pp. 65–93. doi:10.1007/978-94-017-2809-6_4.
- Bosellini, A.; Mutti, E.; Ricci Lucchi, F. (1989). Rocce e successioni sedimentarie. UTET. ISBN 978-880-204-306-7.
- Mutti, E.; Davoli, G. (1992). Turbidite Sandstones. Agip and University of Parma. OCLC 654484776.
- Mutti, E.; Tinterri, R.; Remacha, E.; Mavilla, N.; Angella, S.; Fava, L. (1999). An Introduction to the Analysis of Ancient Turbidite Basins from an Outcrop Perspective. American Association of Petroleum Geologists. ISBN 978-162-981-014-0.
