= Charles Schuchert Award =

Presented by the Paleontological Society

The Charles Schuchert Award is presented by the Paleontological Society to a person under 40 whose work reflects excellence and promise in the science of paleontology. The award was made in honor of Charles Schuchert (1858 – 1942), an American invertebrate paleontologist.

== Awardees ==
Source: Paleontological Society

- 2024: Erin Saupe
- 2023: Erik Sperling
- 2022: Matt Friedman
- 2021: Melanie Hopkins
- 2020: Lee Hsiang Liow
- 2019: Jingmai O'Connor
- 2018: Seth Finnegan
- 2017: Caroline Strömberg
- 2016: Alycia Stigall
- 2015: Jonathan Payne
- 2014: Shanan Peters
- 2013: Bridget Wade
- 2012: Gene Hunt
- 2011: C. Kevin Boyce
- 2010: Philip Donoghue
- 2009: Tom Olszewski
- 2008: Michael Engel
- 2007: John Alroy
- 2006: Shuhai Xiao
- 2005: Michal Kowalewski
- 2004: Peter J. Wagner
- 2003: Steven M. Holland
- 2002: Bruce S. Lieberman
- 2001: Loren E. Babcock
- 2000: Michael J. Foote
- 1999: Charles R. Marshall
- 1998: Paul L. Koch
- 1997: Mary L. Droser
- 1996: Douglas H. Erwin
- 1995: Susan M. Kidwell
- 1994: Christopher G. Maples
- 1993: Peter R. Crane
- 1992: Stephen J. Culver
- 1991: Donald R. Prothero
- 1990: William I. Ausich & Carlton E. Brett
- 1989: Simon Conway Morris
- 1988: David Jablonski
- 1987: Andrew H. Knoll
- 1986: John A. Barron
- 1985: Jennifer A. Kitchell
- 1984: Daniel C. Fisher
- 1983: J. John Sepkoski, Jr.
- 1982: James Sprinkle
- 1981: Philip D. Gingerich
- 1980: James Doyle
- 1979: R. Niles Eldredge
- 1978: Robert L. Carroll
- 1977: Steven M. Stanley
- 1976: Thomas J. M. Schopf
- 1975: Stephen Jay Gould
- 1974: James W. Schopf
- 1973: David M. Raup

== See also ==
- List of paleontology awards
