= David M. Raup =

American paleontologist

- Born: April 24, 1933; Boston, Massachusetts, U.S.
- Died: July 9, 2015 (aged 82); Sturgeon Bay, Door County, Wisconsin, U.S.
- Education: University of Chicago; Harvard University
- Awards: Charles Schuchert Award (1973); Paleontological Society Medal (1997)
- Scientific career
- Fields: Paleontology; Paleobiology
- Workplaces: University of Chicago

David M. Raup (April 24, 1933 – July 9, 2015) was an American paleontologist at the University of Chicago. Raup studied the fossil record and the diversity of life on Earth. Raup contributed to the knowledge of extinction events along with his colleague Jack Sepkoski. They suggested that the extinction of dinosaurs 66 mya was part of a cycle of mass extinctions that may have occurred every 26 million years.

== Biography ==
=== Early life ===
Born on April 24, 1933, and raised in Boston, Raup's interest in the fossil record did not begin at a young age, having had very little contact with such things until later in life. He focused instead on leisure activities such as skiing and camping. His first mentor was John Clark, a vertebrate paleontologist and sedimentologist at the University of Chicago while starting his education.

=== Career ===
Raup began his academic career at Colby College in Maine before transferring two years later to the University of Chicago where he earned his Bachelor of Science degree. From there, he went to Harvard for graduate studies where he majored in geology while focussing on paleontology and biology; he earned his MA and PhD degrees there.

Raup taught at Caltech, Johns Hopkins and the University of Rochester. He was a curator and Dean of Science at the Field Museum of Natural History in Chicago as well as a visiting professor in Germany at Tübingen and on the faculty of the College of the Virgin Islands. Raup was heavily involved through his career in joint programs with biology and in promoting training of paleontologists in modern marine environments. In 1994, he retired to Washington Island in northern Lake Michigan. Prior to his death, he assisted the Santa Fe Institute to develop methods and approaches to dealing with the evolutionary exploration of morphospace. He died on July 9, 2015, of pneumonia. The Hungaria asteroid 9165 Raup was named in his honor.

== Honors ==
Raup was elected to the American Academy of Arts and Sciences in 1996 and the American Philosophical Society in 2002.

== Selected publications ==
Books

- Raup, David; Stanley, Steven M. (1978). Principles of Paleontology (2 ed.). Macmillan. ISBN 978-0-7167-0022-7.
- Raup, David (1986). The Nemesis Affair: A Story of the Death of Dinosaurs and the Ways of Science. W. W. Norton & Company. ISBN 978-0-393-02342-8.
- Raup, David (1986). "Patterns and Processes in the History of Life". In David M. Raup and David Jablonski (ed.). Report of the Dahlem Workshop on Patterns and Processes in the History of Life, 16–21 June 1985. Berlin: Springer Verlag. ISBN 978-0-387-15965-2.
- Raup, David (1992). Extinction: Bad Genes or Bad Luck?. W. W. Norton & Company. ISBN 978-0-393-30927-0.
- Raup, David (1999). The Nemesis Affair: A Story of the Death of Dinosaurs and the Ways of Science (Revised and Expanded). W. W. Norton & Company. ISBN 978-0-393-31918-7.

Periodicals

- Raup, David M. (1962). "Computer as aid in describing form in gastropod shells". Science. 138 (3537): 150–152. Bibcode:1962Sci...138..150R. doi:10.1126/science.138.3537.150. PMID 17818401. S2CID 20264319.
- Raup, David M. (1966). "Geometric analysis of shell coiling: general problems". Journal of Paleontology. 40: 1178–1190.
- Raup, David M. (12 October 1979). "Size of the Permo-Triassic Bottleneck and Its Evolutionary Implications". Science. 206 (4415): 217–218. Bibcode:1979Sci...206..217R. doi:10.1126/science.206.4415.217. PMID 17801788. S2CID 46450875.
- Raup, David M.; Sepkoski, J. John Jr. (19 March 1982). "Mass extinctions in the marine fossil record". Science. 215 (4539): 1501–3. Bibcode:1982Sci...215.1501R. doi:10.1126/science.215.4539.1501. PMID 17788674. S2CID 43002817.
- Raup, David M.; Sepkoski, J. John Jr. (February 1984). "Periodicity of extinctions in the geologic past" (PDF). Proc. Natl. Acad. Sci. USA. 81 (3): 801–805. Bibcode:1984PNAS...81..801R. doi:10.1073/pnas.81.3.801. PMC 344925. PMID 6583680.
- Raup, David M. (1994). "The Role of Extinction in Evolution" (PDF). Proc. Natl. Acad. Sci. USA. 91 (15): 6758–6763. Bibcode:1994PNAS...91.6758R. doi:10.1073/pnas.91.15.6758. PMC 44280. PMID 8041694.
