= Loren E. Babcock =

American geologist

Dr. Loren E. Babcock (born May 26, 1961) is an American geologist. He is professor of Earth Science at Ohio State University. Babcock has written over 125 scientific articles and the textbook, Visualizing Earth History. He researches topics in processes of fossilization and the evolutionary history of trilobites and other Cambrian fossils. A fellow from the Geological Society of America, Babcock was the recipient of the Charles Schuchert Award for Excellence and Promise in Paleontology and the Erasmus Haworth Award for Distinguished Alumni Honors in Geology. He received a Ph.D. from the University of Kansas in 1990.

In 2008, he was one of a team of researchers who discovered the oldest footprints ever found, over 570 million years old, in Nevada. Although he was uncertain, Babcock believed that they came from an arthropod species.

In 2005, Babcock allegedly had sexual relations with his research assistant. The Lantern reported that he gave her gifts from travel abroad, including a trilobite fossil and a garment from China. After reports from both sides were made to Ohio State University, Babcock requested an apology and compensation for costs and damages to his reputation from the president of the university, but The Lantern reports that the president never responded.
