= Robin Gilbert Charles Bathurst =

English geologist (1920–2006)

Robin Gilbert Charles Bathurst (21 March 1920, Chelsea, London – 24 May 2006, Derwen Dêg Fawr, North Wales) was a British geologist, known as a leading expert on the diagenesis of carbonate sediments.

== Biography ==
During WW II, Robin G. C. Bathurst served from 1939 to 1943 as an anti-aircraft gunner. He studied at Chelsea Polytechnic and at Imperial College London, where he graduated with a BSc in 1948. From 1948 to 1951 at the University of Cambridge, he studied the Wealden Greensand under Percival Allen and graduated with an MSc

In 1951 Robert Millner Shackleton appointed Bathurst to teach sedimentology at the University of Liverpool. During the 1920s and 1930s, Lucien Cayeux and Bruno Sander gained international reputations for research in carbonate petrology – Bathurst went beyond their achievements in carbonate petrology and significantly contributed to geologists' understanding of limestones. In 1959 he was the first to describe radiaxial fibrous calcite (RFC). In 1980 he introduced the important hypothesis that "stromatactis is the cement (and sediment) fill of a system of cavities which developed between submarine-cemented crusts on a carbonate mud mound."

Bathurst received an honorary Ph.D. in 1966 from the University of Liverpool and an honorary D.Sc. in 1974 from the University of London. He received in 1978 the Lyell Medal from the Geological Society of London, in 1983 the Twenhofel Medal from SEPM, and in 1986 the Sorby Medal from the International Association of Sedimentologists. He was one of twenty sedimentologists having biographical entries in the Encyclopedia of Sediments and Sedimentary Rocks (2003, Kluwer). In 2006 the University of Liverpool named in his honour the Bathurst Laboratory, Department of Earth and Ocean Sciences.

Bathurst gave lectures in many different countries. He worked with the German geologist Johannes Herbert Schroeder (1939–2018) in extending a pre-planned visit to Berlin to include workshops and lectures in Potsdam at the German Academy of Sciences at Berlin three months after the 1989 Fall of the Berlin Wall.

At the University of Liverpool, Bathurst retired in 1987 as professor emeritus. In retirement, his skill in watercolours of natural scenes led to exhibitions and invitations into professional artists's societies. He married Diana Warren Piper in 1949. Their marriage lasted until his death in 2006, and they had three sons.

== Articles ==
- Bathurst, R. G. C. (1959). "The Cavernous Structure of Some Mississippian Stromatactis Reefs in Lancashire, England". The Journal of Geology. 67 (5): 506–521. Bibcode:1959JG.....67..506B. doi:10.1086/626604. S2CID 129403828.
- — (1959). "Diagenesis in Mississippian Calcilutites and Pseudobreccias". SEPM Journal of Sedimentary Research. doi:10.1306/74D7092F-2B21-11D7-8648000102C1865D.
- — (1961). "Diagenetic fabrics in some British Dinantian limestones". Geological Journal. 2 (1): 11–36. Bibcode:1961GeolJ...2...11B. doi:10.1002/gj.3350020103.
- — (1966). "Boring algae, micrite envelopes and lithification of molluscan biosparites". Geological Journal. 5 (1): 15–32. Bibcode:1966GeolJ...5...15B. doi:10.1002/gj.3350050104.
- — (1967). "Subtidal Gelatinous Mat, Sand Stabilizer and Food, Great Bahama Bank". The Journal of Geology. 75 (6): 736–738. Bibcode:1967JG.....75..736B. doi:10.1086/627298. S2CID 140563150.
- — (1967). "Depth indicators in sedimentary carbonates". Marine Geology. 5 (5–6): 447–471. Bibcode:1967MGeol...5..447B. doi:10.1016/0025-3227(67)90053-9.
- — (1968). "Precipitation of Oöids and Other Aragonite Fabrics in Warm Seas". Recent Developments in Carbonate Sedimentology in Central Europe. pp. 1–10. doi:10.1007/978-3-642-88052-0_1. ISBN 978-3-642-88054-4.
- — (1970). "Problems of lithification in carbonate muds". Proceedings of the Geologists' Association. 81 (3): 429–440. Bibcode:1970PrGA...81..429B. doi:10.1016/S0016-7878(70)80005-0.
- — (1974). "Marine Diagenesis of Shallow Water Calcium Carbonate Sediments". Annual Review of Earth and Planetary Sciences. 2: 257–274. Bibcode:1974AREPS...2..257B. doi:10.1146/annurev.ea.02.050174.001353.
- — (1976). "Problems in the Recognition of Ancient Carbonate Environments". Proceedings of the Carbonate Seminar. Indonesian Petroleum Association, AAPG Datapages: 99–102.
- — (1976). "The Evolution of Porosity in Carbonate Rocks and the Emplacement of Cement". Proceedings of the Carbonate Seminar. Indonesian Petroleum Association, AAPG Datapages: 112–115.
- — (1980). "Stromatactis—Origin related to submarine-cemented crusts in Paleozoic mud mounds". Geology. 8 (3): 131. Bibcode:1980Geo.....8..131B. doi:10.1130/0091-7613(1980)8<131:SRTSCI>2.0.CO;2. ISSN 0091-7613.
- — (1982). "Genesis of stromatactis cavities between submarine crusts in Palaeozoic carbonate mud buildups". Journal of the Geological Society. 139 (2): 165–181. Bibcode:1982JGSoc.139..165B. doi:10.1144/gsjgs.139.2.0165. S2CID 130499781.

== Books ==
- Bathurst, R. G. C. (January 1972). Carbonate Sediments and Their Diagenesis. Elsevier. ISBN 9780080869230.
- Tucker, Maurice E.; Bathurst, R. G. C., eds. (15 April 2009). Carbonate Diagenesis. John Wiley & Sons. ISBN 9781444304527.
