= Mary Clark Thompson Medal =

The Mary Clark Thompson Medal is awarded by the U.S. National Academy of Sciences "for most important service to geology and paleontology." Named after Mary Clark Thompson and first awarded in 1921, it was originally presented every three years together with a $15,000 prize.

From 2017 the medal will be awarded alternately with the Daniel Giraud Elliot Medal as the triennial NAS Award in the Evolution of Earth and Life. The Elliot Medal will recognise meritorious work in zoology or paleontology whilst the Mary Clark Thompson Medal will continue to honour important services to geology and paleontology. Each medal will be presented with a $20,000 prize.

== Recipients ==
Source: NAS

Shuhai Xiao (2021)

Susan M. Kidwell (2015)

For her groundbreaking work on fossil preservation that has transformed our view of how the history of life is encoded in the rock record. Her studies have revealed the fidelity of the fossil record, and thereby have yielded powerful insights to the evolution and ecology of ancient life on Earth.

Andrew H. Knoll (2012)

For unparalleled contributions relating Precambrian life to Earth's physical and chemical history and for innovative contributions on the paleophysiology and evolution of algae and land plants.

Alfred G. Fischer (2009)

For leadership and research in the discovery of the cyclical and period nature of the sedimentary record in the geologic past and its connections with earth-system change, including biodiversity.

Steven M. Stanley (2006)

For research and leadership in bivalve functional morphology and the macroevolution of disparate animals, including hominids, in the context of Earth's physical and chemical history.

Frederik J. Hilgen (2003)

For his meticulous integration of various geological, geophysical, and proxy cyclostratigraphic sedimentological records in developing a late Neogene (12-0Ma) astronomical time scale.

Jan Smit (1999)

For establishing the sequence of impact-generated events that occurred 65 million years ago, including ejecta fallout, tsunami propagation, geochemical disturbances, and extinction in foraminifera and dinosaurs.

David L. Jones (1995)

For his development of terrane-tectonic theory through geologic mapping of westernmost North America and the biostratigraphic study of radiolarians in deepwater chert.

Harry B. Whittington (1990)

J. William Schopf (1986)

W. A. Berggren (1982)

James M. Schopf (1976)

Hollis D. Hedberg (1973)

Raymond C. Moore (1970)

Wendell P. Woodring (1967)

Milton N. Bramlette (1964)

Norman D. Newell (1961)

Roman Kozłowski (1958)

G. Arthur Cooper (1957)

Alfred S. Romer (1954)

Lloyd W. Stephenson (1952)

Lauge Koch (1949)

Frank H. McLearn (1948)

John Bernard Reeside, Jr. (1946)

Thomas W. Vaughan (1945)

William Joscelyn Arkell (1944)

George G. Simpson (1943)

Edward W. Berry and Arthur S. Woodward (1942)

David M. Watson (1941)

Amadeus William Grabau (1936)

Charles Schuchert (1934)

Francis A. Bather (1932)

David L. White (1931)

William Berryman Scott and Edward Oscar Ulrich (1930)

James P. Smith (1928)

John M. Clarke (1925)

Emmanuel de Margerie (1923)

Charles Doolittle Walcott (1921)

== See also ==
- List of geology awards
- Prizes named after people
