= Teresa Jordan =

Sedimentary geologist

Teresa Eileen Jordan
- Born: April 14, 1953; Dunkirk, New York
- Education: Stanford University
- Scientific career
- Workplaces: Cornell University
- Thesis: Evolution of the late Pennsylvanian - early Permian, western Oquirrh basin, Utah (1979)

Teresa (Terry) Jordan is a sedimentary geologist known for her research on the geology and hydrology of the Atacama Desert and the use of water and geothermal heat from sedimentary rocks.

== Education and career ==
Jordan has a B.S. from Rensselaer Polytechnic Institute (1974) and earned a Ph.D. from Stanford University (1979). Following her Ph.D., she moved to Cornell University, initially in a research position, then she joined the faculty in 1984. She was named the J. Preston Levis Professor of Engineering in 2005.

In 2014, Jordan was named a fellow of the American Geophysical Union, and the citation was "for integration of geodynamic principles and stratigraphic data that has led to understanding of the coupling of continental basins to mountain belts."

== Research ==
Jordan's research spans geology and engineering. In Chile, she works on the climate and hydrology of the Atacama Desert, with a particular focus on the impact of large rainfall events on the region. She also examines the tectonic history of the Central Andes Plateau. Jordan is co-investigator on the effort to drill a research borehole to inform the Cornell University project on geothermal heat as an energy source in 2022.

=== Selected publications ===
- JORDAN, TERESA E.; ISACKS, BRYAN L.; ALLMENDINGER, RICHARD W.; BREWER, JON A.; RAMOS, VICTOR A.; ANDO, CLIFFORD J. (1 March 1983). "Andean tectonics related to geometry of subducted Nazca plate". GSA Bulletin. 94 (3): 341–361. Bibcode:1983GSAB...94..341J. doi:10.1130/0016-7606(1983)94<341:ATRTGO>2.0.CO;2. ISSN 0016-7606.
- Jordan, Teresa E. (1981). "Thrust Loads and Foreland Basin Evolution, Cretaceous, Western United States". AAPG Bulletin. 65. doi:10.1306/03B599F4-16D1-11D7-8645000102C1865D.
- Jordan, T. E.; Allmendinger, R. W. (1 December 1986). "The Sierras Pampeanas of Argentina; a modern analogue of Rocky Mountain foreland deformation". American Journal of Science. 286 (10): 737–764. Bibcode:1986AmJS..286..737J. doi:10.2475/ajs.286.10.737.
- Jordan, T. E.; Nester, P. L.; Blanco, N.; Hoke, G. D.; Dávila, F.; Tomlinson, A. J. (2010). "Uplift of the Altiplano-Puna plateau: A view from the west". Tectonics. 29 (5): n/a. Bibcode:2010Tecto..29.5007J. doi:10.1029/2010TC002661. hdl:11336/54246. ISSN 1944-9194. S2CID 129582894.
- Jordan, Teresa E.; Kirk-Lawlor, Naomi E.; Blanco, Nicolás P.; Rech, Jason A.; Cosentino, Nicolás J. (2014-07-01). "Landscape modification in response to repeated onset of hyperarid paleoclimate states since 14 Ma, Atacama Desert, Chile". GSA Bulletin. 126 (7–8): 1016–1046. Bibcode:2014GSAB..126.1016J. doi:10.1130/B30978.1. ISSN 0016-7606.

== Awards and honors ==
- Fellow, Geological Society of America (1995)
- Corresponding Member, Asociación Geológica Argentina (1997)
- Lawrence Sloss award, Geological Society of America (2005)
- Fellow, American Geophysical Union (2014)
- William H. Twenhofel Medal, Society for Sedimentary Geology (2021)
- Leopold von Buch Medal, German Geological Society (2024)
