= Culumbodina =

Scientific classification
- Kingdom: Animalia
- Phylum: Chordata
- Infraphylum: Agnatha
- Class: †Conodonta
- Order: †Panderodontida
- Family: †Panderodontidae
- Genus: †Culumbodina; Sweet 1979

Species
- †Culumbodina occidentalis Sweet; †Culumbodina penna Sweet

Extinct genus of jawless fishes

Culumbodina is an extinct conodont genus.
