= 9165 Raup =

Asteroid

Discovery
- Discovered by: C. Shoemaker; E. Shoemaker
- Discovery site: Palomar Obs.
- Discovery date: 27 September 1987

Designations
- Named after: David M. Raup (paleontologist)
- Alternative designations: 1987 SJ_{3} · 1955 BF_{1} 1973 UH
- Minor planet category: main-belt · (inner); Hungaria

Orbital characteristics
- Epoch 4 September 2017 (JD 2458000.5)
- Uncertainty parameter 0
- Observation arc: 29.60 yr (10,810 days)
- Aphelion: 2.1792 AU
- Perihelion: 1.7932 AU
- Semi-major axis: 1.9862 AU
- Eccentricity: 0.0972
- Orbital period (sidereal): 2.80 yr (1,022 days)
- Mean anomaly: 264.67°
- Mean motion: 0° 21^{m} 7.56^{s} / day
- Inclination: 24.598°
- Longitude of ascending node: 15.003°
- Argument of perihelion: 332.15°

Physical characteristics
- Dimensions: 4.62 km (calculated); 4.839±0.167 km
- Synodic rotation period: 560±25 h (dated); 1320±10 h
- Geometric albedo: 0.30 (assumed); 0.329±0.058
- Spectral type: S
- Absolute magnitude (H): 13.40 · 13.6

9165 Raup, provisional designation 1987 SJ_{3}, is a stony Hungaria asteroid and exceptionally slow rotator from the inner regions of the asteroid belt, approximately 4.7 kilometers in diameter.

It was discovered on 27 September 1987, by American astronomer couple Carolyn and Eugene Shoemaker at the U.S. Palomar Observatory in California. The asteroid was later named after American paleontologist David M. Raup.

== Classification and orbit ==
Raup is a bright S-type asteroid is a member of the Hungaria family, which form the innermost dense concentration of asteroids in the Solar System. It orbits the Sun in the innermost main-belt at a distance of 1.8–2.2 AU once every 2 years and 10 months (1,022 days). Its orbit has an eccentricity of 0.10 and an inclination of 25° with respect to the ecliptic.

It was first identified as 1955 BF_{1} at the discovering observatory in 1955, extending the body's observation arc by 32 years prior to its official discovery observation.

== Physical characteristics ==
=== Slow rotator ===
In September 2015, a rotational lightcurve of Raup was obtained from photometric observations by American astronomer Brian Warner at his Palmer Divide Station in Colorado. It gave a well-defined rotation period of 1320±10 hours with a brightness variation of 1.34 magnitude (U=3-).

As of 2016, it is the 3rd slowest rotating minor planet in the Light Curve Data Base (LCDB). Also, the lightcurve's high amplitude indicates that the body has a non-spheroidal shape. Brian Warner's 2015-observation supersedes a previously obtained lightcurve that gave a significantly shorter period of 560±25 hours with an amplitude of 1.05 magnitude (U=2).

=== Diameter and albedo ===
According to the survey carried out by the NEOWISE mission of NASA's Wide-field Infrared Survey Explorer, Raup measures 4.8 kilometers in diameter and its surface has a high albedo of 0.329, while the Collaborative Asteroid Lightcurve Link assumes a standard albedo for Hungaria asteroids of 0.30, and calculates a diameter of 4.6 kilometers, based on an absolute magnitude of 13.6.

== Naming ==
This minor planet was named in honor of American David M. Raup (1933–2015), paleontologist and expert on the fossil record at UChicago. Raup's theories contributed to the knowledge of extinction events and suggested, that the extinction of dinosaurs was part of a cycle of mass extinctions. the official naming citation was published on 23 November 1999 (M.P.C. 36947).
