= David White House =

Historic house in Washington, D.C., United States

- U.S. National Register of Historic Places
- U.S. National Historic Landmark
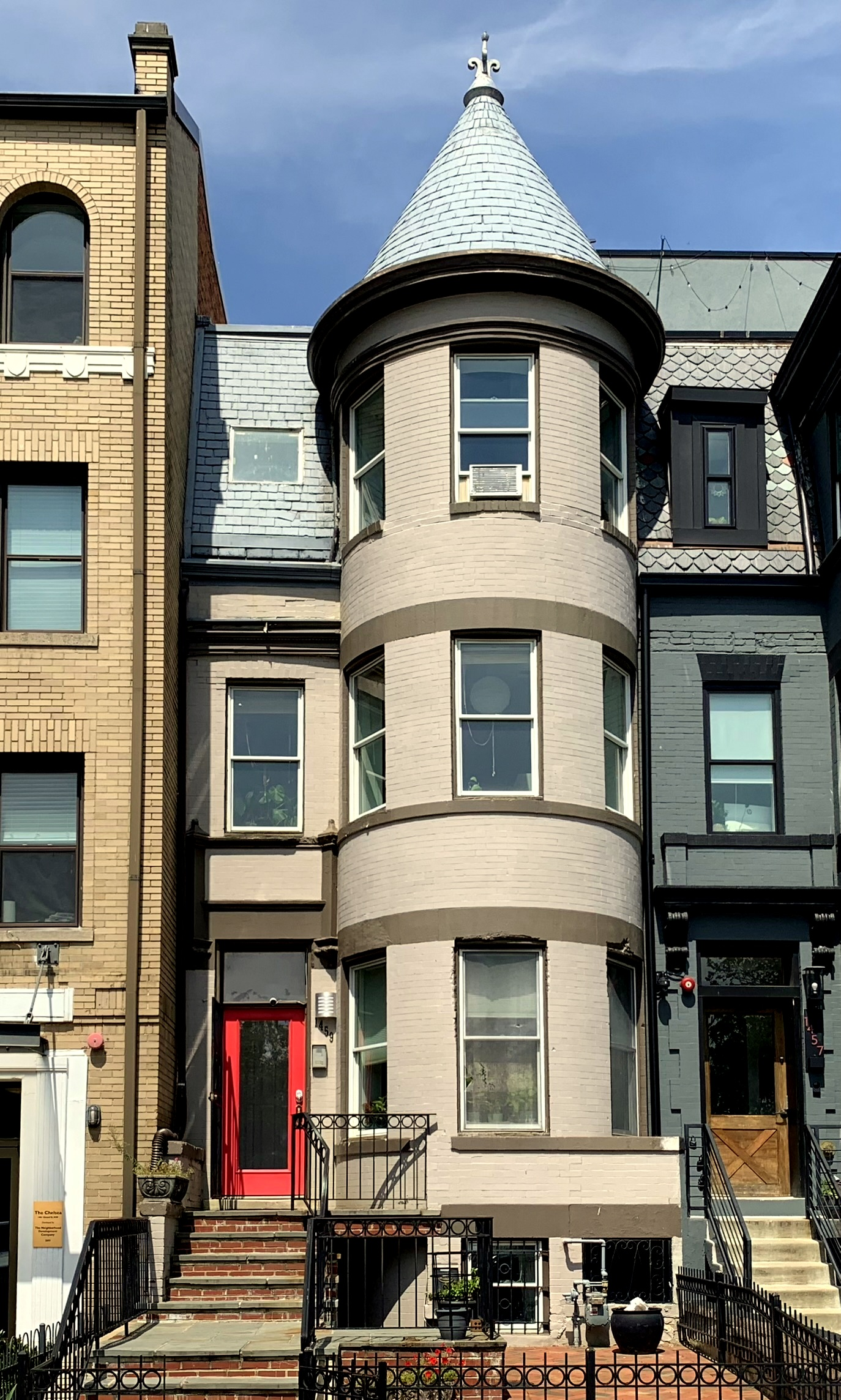
- David White House in 2023

- Location within Washington, D.C.
- Location: 1459 Girard Street NW Washington, D.C.
- Coordinates: 38°55′32″N 77°2′4″W
- NRHP reference No.: 76002133

Significant dates
- Added to NRHP: January 7, 1976
- Designated NHL: January 7, 1976

The David White House is a historic house at 1459 Girard Street NW in Washington, D.C. A National Historic Landmark, it was the home of geologist David White (1862–1935) from 1910 to 1925. White had a longtime association with the United States Geological Survey (USGS), and performed groundbreaking research on peat and petroleum geology.

== Description and history ==
The David White House is located in Washington's Columbia Heights neighborhood, on the north side of Girard Street between 14th and 15th Streets. It is one of three turreted buildings a row of 19th century rowhouses that line the block. The three-story house has a facade consisting of Roman brick with greystone trim, round turreted bay, and mansard roof and is one of a row of three designed in 1902 by distinguished architect C.L. Harding and built by T.A. Harding. NHL designation and NR listing January 7, 1976, DC listing March 3, 1979.

David White was a native of New York and was educated in geology at Cornell University. After graduation he took a job with the USGS, and made Washington his home from 1886 until his death. Of the places he lived in the city, this house was his home for the longest period. During his lifelong career there, he became an acknowledged expert on the stratigraphy of the Paleozoic era, and performed research identifying the links between paleobotany and the formation of coal deposits. Uniquely among researchers of the period, he performed much of his field work personally instead of hiring it out. His achievement awards include the Thomson Medal and the Walcott Medal.

== See also ==
- List of National Historic Landmarks in Washington, D.C.
- National Register of Historic Places listings in the upper NW Quadrant of Washington, D.C.
