= William H. Twenhofel Medal =

The William H. Twenhofel Medal is the highest award given by the Society for Sedimentary Geology (SEPM). It was instituted in memory of William H. Twenhofel and is awarded annually to a person for his or her "Outstanding Contributions to Sedimentary Geology."

Nominees are chosen for having made outstanding contributions to paleontology, sedimentology, stratigraphy, and/or allied scientific disciplines. The contributions normally involve extensive personal research, but may involve some combination of research, teaching, administration, or other activities which have notably advanced scientific knowledge in Sedimentary Geology.

== Past recipients ==
(NM) denotes that the recipient was not a member of SEPM.

- 1973- Raymond C. Moore
- 1974- Francis J. Pettijohn
- 1975- Edwin D. McKee
- 1976- Robert R. Shrock
- 1977- William C. Krumbein
- 1978- Carl Owen Dunbar
- 1979- Robert L. Folk
- 1980- Laurence L. Sloss
- 1981- Walter D. Keller
- 1982- Alfred G. Fischer
- 1983- Robin G. C. Bathurst
- 1984- Kenneth J. Hsu
- 1985- Robert N. Ginsburg
- 1986- Franklyn B. Van Houten
- 1987- John R. L. Allen
- 1988- Hans E. Reineck
- 1989- Kenneth O. Emery
- 1990- James Lee Wilson
- 1991- John Imbrie (NM)
- 1992- Peter R. Vail
- 1993- Robert H. Dott, Jr.
- 1994- Harold G. Reading
- 1995- Robert J. Weimer

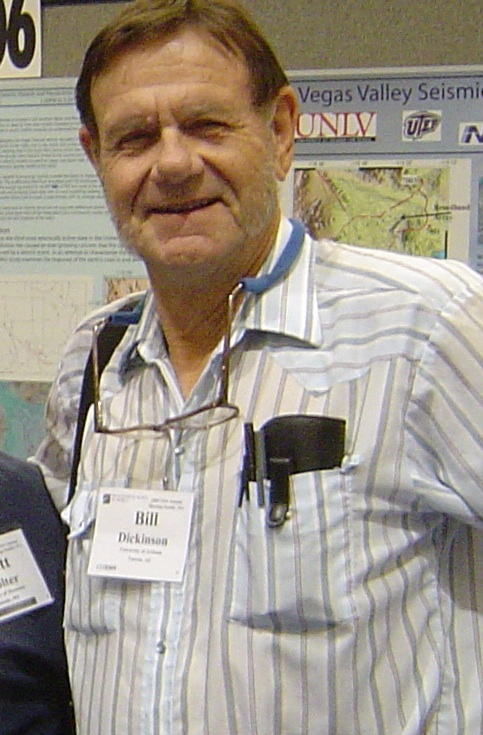
Bill Dickinson in 2004

- 1996- Grover E. Murray
- 1997- Gerald M. Friedman
- 1998- Erle Kauffman
- 1999- Lloyd C. Pray
- 2000- William R. Dickinson
- 2001- William L. Fisher
- 2002- Noel P. James
- 2003- Gerard V. Middleton
- 2004- Emiliano Mutti
- 2005- Wolfgang Schlager
- 2006- William Hay
- 2007- John Warme
- 2008 - Steven M. Stanley
- 2009 - Eugene Shinn
- 2010 - J.F. (Rick) Sarg
- 2011 - Dag Nummedal
- 2012 - John C. Harms
- 2013 - Paul Enos
- 2014 - John Southard
- 2015 - Robert W. Dalrymple
- 2016 - Ronald Steel (University of Texas)
- 2017 - Judith Ann McKenzie
- 2018 - Donald R. Lowe
- 2019 - S. George Pemberton
- 2020 - Philip A. Allen
- 2021 - Teresa (Terry) Jordan
- 2022: David Bottjer
- 2023: Gail Ashley
- 2024: John Grotzinger

== See also ==
- List of geology awards
