= William Henry Twenhofel =

American sedimentary geologist

- Born: 16 April 1875; Covington, Kentucky, United States
- Died: 4 January 1957 (aged 81)
- Education: National Normal School (Lebanon, Ohio}; Yale University
- Occupation: sedimentary geologist
- Known for: professor of geology at the University of Wisconsin; co-founding associate editor for the Journal of Sedimentary Petrology
- Notable work: Treatise on Sedimentation
- Spouse: Virgie M. Stephens (m. 1899)
- Children: 3
- Parents: Ernst A. H. J. Twenhofel (father); Helena Steuwer (mother)

William Henry Twenhofel (16 April 1875 – 4 January 1957) was an American sedimentary geologist who wrote a landmark text Treatise on Sedimentation (1926) which went into more editions. He served for many years as a professor of geology at the University of Wisconsin. The Society of Economic Paleontologists and Mineralogists instituted the Twenhofel Medal in his memory.

Twenhofel was born in Covington, Kentucky, to German-immigrant farming family of Helena Steuwer and Ernst A. H. J. Twenhofel. He grew up working on the farm and was educated at local public schools. From 1896, he taught in local schools in winter and worked in summer to earn for his livelihood. In 1902 he went to the National Normal School in Lebanon, Ohio, receiving a BA in 1904. He then taught at the East Texas Normal College. In 1908 he joined Yale University and received a BA in geology, and an MA (1910). While at Yale, Twenhofel accompanied Charles Schuchert to examine the Ordovician-Silurian boundary in Canada and examined Anticosti Island, Quebec for his PhD (1912). He took up a position of assistant professor at the University of Kansas in 1910. In 1916, he joined the University of Wisconsin working there until his retirement. Along with Raymond C. Moore he was one of the founding associate editors for the Journal of Sedimentary Petrology from 1931.

Twenhofel married Virgie M. Stephens in 1899 and they had three children.
