= Steven M. Stanley =

American paleontologist

Steven M. Stanley (born November 2, 1941) is an American paleontologist and evolutionary biologist at the Florida State University. He is best known for his empirical research documenting the evolutionary process of punctuated equilibrium in the fossil record.

== Biography ==
Stanley received his Ph.D. from Yale University in 1968. For most of his career he taught geology at Johns Hopkins University (1969-2005). In 1977 Stanley was awarded the Paleontological Society's Charles Schuchert Award which is presented "to a person under 40 whose work reflects excellence and promise in the science of paleontology." In 2007 he was awarded the Society's Paleontological Society Medal, which is "awarded to a person whose eminence is based on advancement of knowledge in paleontology." In 2006 Stanley was awarded the Mary Clark Thompson Medal by the National Academy of Sciences and in 2008 the William H. Twenhofel Medal by the Society for Sedimentary Geology.

In 1972 Stanley developed the Predation Hypothesis to explain the evolution of novelties in the Cambrian explosion. Stanley proposed that predation stimulated prey animals to evolve defenses such as shells, rapid swimming, and burrowing. These strategies also opened new avenues of evolution through functional shifts. Hard shells allowed for filter feeding, and deep burrowing allowed animals to gain new access to food resources.

Stanley acted as a "personal editor" on several PNAS papers about the controversial Younger Dryas impact hypothesis, starting with the original 2007 paper and continuing even after revelations of misconduct by a key contributor. He admitted to a Nature reporter that "It has been very controversial… It's my view that I should help to get this stuff published." The hypothesis was comprehensively refuted in 2023.

== Bibliography ==
- Stanley, S. M. (1973). "An Ecological Theory for the Sudden Origin of Multicellular Life in the Late Precambrian." Proc. Natl. Acad. Sci. USA. 70 (May 1): 1486-1489.
- Stanley, S. M. (1975). "A theory of evolution above the species level." Proc. Natl. Acad. Sci. USA. 72 (Feb 1): 646-650.
- Stanley, S. M. (1978). "Chronospecies' longevities, the origin of genera, and the punctuational model of evolution." Paleobiology 4 (1): 26-40.
- Stanley, S. M. (1979). Macroevolution: Pattern and Process. San Francisco: W. H. Freeman.
- Stanley, S. M. (1981). The New Evolutionary Timetable. New York: Basic Books. ISBN 0-465-05013-1
- Stanley, S. M. (1985). "Rates of evolution." Paleobiology 11 (1): 13-26.
- Stanley, S. M. (1987). Extinction. San Francisco: W. H. Freeman.
- Stanley, S. M. (1987). "The controversy over punctuational evolution." Geol. Soc. Amer. Abstr. with Progr. 19: 854.
- Stanley, S. M. (1992). "The Empirical Case for the Punctuational Model of Evolution." In A. Somit and S. Peterson. The Dynamics of Evolution. Ithaca: Cornell University Press.
- Stanley, S. M. (1996). Children of the Ice Age. New York: Harmony Books.
- Stanley, S. M. (2000). "The past climate change heats up." Proc. Natl. Acad. Sci. USA. 97 (Feb. 15): 1319.
- Stanley, S. M. (2008). Earth System History. San Francisco: W. H. Freeman.
- Raup, S. M. and S. M. Stanley (1971). Principles of Paleontology. San Francisco: W. H. Freeman.
- Stanley, S. M. and Xiangning Yang (1987) "Approximate evolutionary stasis for bivalve morphology over millions of years." Paleobiology 13: 113-139.
