= Michael Foote =

American paleontologist

Michael J. Foote (born 1963) is a paleontologist and co-author, with Arnold I. Miller, of Principles of Paleontology (2006).

He was awarded the Charles Schuchert Award of the Paleontological Society in 2000. He is currently on the faculty at the University of Chicago, where he is Louis Block Distinguished Service Professor in the Department of the Geophysical Sciences and the Committee on Evolutionary Biology.
