= John D. Cooper Archaeological and Paleontological Center =

Established by Oc parks and California state university

Dr. John D. Cooper Archaeological and Paleontological Center
- Established: July 2011
- Location: Orange County, California
- Type: Research Institute
- Director: Dr. Jere H. Lipps
- Curators: Eric Scott, Paleontology Jeannine Pedersen, Archaeology Dr. James Parham, Paleontology Dr. Steven James, Archaeology
- Website: http://coopercenter.fullerton.edu/

The Dr. John D. Cooper Archaeological and Paleontological Center, or Cooper Center, was established by OC Parks and California State University, Fullerton in order to conserve, archive and manage the Orange County Archaeology and Paleontology Collections, including six million fossils. The center opened in July 2011 and is in Orange County, California.

The Cooper Center was named to commemorate Dr. John D. Cooper, professor emeritus of geological science at Cal State Fullerton, who campaigned for the conservation of the Orange County Collection, and died in 2007.
