= Philip A. Allen =

British sedimentary geologist (1953–2021)

Philip A. Allen (1953, Bath, Somerset, UK – 9 March 2021) was a British geologist, known for his research in sedimentology and stratigraphy.

Philip A. Allen graduated in 1974 with a bachelor's degree in geology from the University College of Wales, Aberystwyth (now named Aberystwyth University). After two years in the petroleum industry, he matriculated as a graduate student at the University of Cambridge. There he graduated with a doctoral degree in 1979. His doctoral dissertation deals with the sedimentology of the Devonian strata of the southeastern Shetland Islands. His dissertation was supervised by Peter F. Friend. As a postdoc, Allen held an academic position at the University of Bern, where he worked with Albert Matter. Philip Allen was a lecturer at Cardiff University and then the University of Oxford, before his appointment to the chair of geology and mineralogy at Trinity College Dublin in 1996. In 2001 he resigned from his Dublin professorship to become a professor of physical sedimentary systems at ETH Zurich. In 2005 he resigned from his Zurich professorship to become a professor at Imperial College London, where he remained until his retirement in 2015 as professor emeritus. In 2004 he served as a senior proctor at the University of Oxford.

Philip A. Allen was the author or co-author of more than 100 scientific articles dealing with many aspects of sedimentology. With his twin brother John R. Allen, who worked as a petroleum geologist for BHP Billiton, he wrote the book Basin Analysis, which went through three editions (1990, 2005, and 2013). The book was an important pioneering effort in the analysis of sedimentary basins and, for several decades, introduced students to connections between sedimentology, geodynamics, and climate. Philip Allen's book Earth Surface Processes unifies geophysics with sedimentology, stratigraphy, and tectonics.

In the first two decades of the 21st century, Philip Allen's team in the 'Geodynamics: From Core to Surface' Sub-Group did research on sediment routing systems and, in particular, made a thorough case study of an ancient sediment routing system in the Spanish Pyrenees. The research involved constructing maps of recent sediment routing systems on continental scales, compiling tectonic and geodetic datasets, and combining data and theory in numerical models. In 2011 Allen chaired the science committee that organized a one-day conference hosted by the Geological Society of London. The conference was a multi-disciplinary gathering of over 100 scientists for understanding how tectonics and Earth's surface processes interact, especially the coupling of mantle dynamics and geological landscape evolution. At the 2013 annual meeting of the European Geosciences Union (EGU), Allen gave a talk on a particular model of a sediment routing system from the Eocene of the Pyrenees.

Allen held a Royal Society-Wolfson research merit award for 2006–2011. In 2007 the Geological Society awarded him the Lyell Medal. From 2009 to 2012 he served as science secretary of the Geological Society of London. In 2020 the Society for Sedimentary Geology (which uses the acronym SEPM for "Society of Economic Paleontologists and Mineralogists") awarded him the William H. Twenhofel Medal.

Philip A. Allen was a Christian believer and wrote 3 books arguing for the compatibility of Christian faith and empirical science.

== Selected publications ==
=== Articles ===
- Allen, P. A.; Homewood, P. (1984). "Evolution and mechanics of a Miocene tidal sandwave". Sedimentology. 31 (1): 63–81. Bibcode:1984Sedim..31...63A. doi:10.1111/j.1365-3091.1984.tb00723.x.
- Allen, Philip A. (1985). "Hummocky cross-stratification is not produced purely under progressive gravity waves". Nature. 313 (6003): 562–564. Bibcode:1985Natur.313..562A. doi:10.1038/313562a0. (See hummocky cross-stratification.)
- "Chapter 10. Dynamics of the Molasse Basin of Western Switzerland by P. Homewood, P. A. Allen, and G. D. Williams". Foreland Basins. John Wiley & Sons. 1986. pp. 199–217. doi:10.1002/9781444303810.ch10. ISBN 978-0-632-01732-4.
- Allen, Philip A.; Crampton, Sarah L.; Sinclair, Hugh D. (1991). "The inception and early evolution of the North Alpine Foreland Basin, Switzerland". Basin Research. 3 (3): 143–163. Bibcode:1991BasR....3..143A. doi:10.1111/j.1365-2117.1991.tb00124.x.
- Sinclair, H. D.; Coakley, B. J.; Allen, P. A.; Watts, A. B. (1991). "Simulation of Foreland Basin Stratigraphy using a diffusion model of mountain belt uplift and erosion: An example from the central Alps, Switzerland". Tectonics. 10 (3): 599–620. Bibcode:1991Tecto..10..599S. doi:10.1029/90TC02507.
- Sinclair, H. D.; Allen, P. A. (1992). "Vertical versus horizontal motions in the Alpine orogenic wedge: Stratigraphic response in the foreland basin". Basin Research. 4 (3–4): 215–232. Bibcode:1992BasR....4..215S. doi:10.1111/j.1365-2117.1992.tb00046.x.
- Hovius, Niels; Stark, Colin P.; Allen, Philip A. (1997). "Sediment flux from a mountain belt derived by landslide mapping". Geology. 25 (3): 231. Bibcode:1997Geo....25..231H. doi:10.1130/0091-7613(1997)025<0231:SFFAMB>2.3.CO;2.
- Allen, Philip A.; Densmore, A. L. (2000). "Sediment flux from an uplifting fault block". Basin Research. 12 (3–4): 367–380. Bibcode:2000BasR...12..367A. doi:10.1111/j.1365-2117.2000.00135.x.
- Allen, Philip (2005). "Striking a chord". Nature. 434 (7036): 961. Bibcode:2005Natur.434..961A. doi:10.1038/434961a. PMID 15846325.
- Allen, Philip A. (2005). "Volte-face in the Punjab". Nature. 438 (7070): 925–926. doi:10.1038/438925a. PMID 16355202.
- Allen, Philip A.; Hoffman, Paul F. (2005). "Extreme winds and waves in the aftermath of a Neoproterozoic glaciation". Nature. 433 (7022): 123–127. Bibcode:2005Natur.433..123A. doi:10.1038/nature03176. PMID 15650730.
- Allen, Philip A. (2007). "Sediment en route to oblivion". Nature. 450 (7169): 490–491. doi:10.1038/450490a. PMID 18033285.
- Allen, Philip A. (2007). "The Huqf Supergroup of Oman: Basin development and context for Neoproterozoic glaciation". Earth-Science Reviews. 84 (3–4): 139–185. Bibcode:2007ESRv...84..139A. doi:10.1016/j.earscirev.2007.06.005.
- Allen, Philip A. (2008). "From landscapes into geological history" (PDF). Nature. 451 (7176): 274–276. Bibcode:2008Natur.451..274A. doi:10.1038/nature06586. PMID 18202641.
- Allen, Philip A. (2008). "Time scales of tectonic landscapes and their sediment routing systems". Geological Society, London, Special Publications. 296 (1): 7–28. Bibcode:2008GSLSP.296....7A. doi:10.1144/SP296.2.
- Allen, Philip A.; Etienne, James L. (2008). "Sedimentary challenge to Snowball Earth". Nature Geoscience. 1 (12): 817–825. Bibcode:2008NatGe...1..817A. doi:10.1038/ngeo355.
- Armitage, John J.; Duller, Robert A.; Whittaker, Alex C.; Allen, Philip A. (2011). "Transformation of tectonic and climatic signals from source to sedimentary archive". Nature Geoscience. 4 (4): 231–235. Bibcode:2011NatGe...4..231A. doi:10.1038/ngeo1087.
- Allen, Philip A. (2011). "Surface impact of mantle processes". Nature Geoscience. 4 (8): 498–499. doi:10.1038/ngeo1216.
- Armitage, John J.; Dunkley Jones, Tom; Duller, Robert A.; Whittaker, Alexander C.; Allen, Philip A. (2013). "Temporal buffering of climate-driven sediment flux cycles by transient catchment response". Earth and Planetary Science Letters. 369–370: 200–210. Bibcode:2013E&PSL.369..200A. doi:10.1016/j.epsl.2013.03.020.
- Allen, Philip A.; Armitage, John J.; Carter, Andrew; Duller, Robert A.; Michael, Nikolas A.; Sinclair, Hugh D.; Whitchurch, Amy L.; Whittaker, Alexander C. (2013). "The Q _{s} problem: Sediment volumetric balance of proximal foreland basin systems". Sedimentology. 60 (1): 102–130. Bibcode:2013Sedim..60..102A. doi:10.1111/sed.12015.
- Michael, N. A.; Whittaker, A. C.; Carter, A.; Allen, P. A. (2014). "Volumetric budget and grain-size fractionation of a geological sediment routing system: Eocene Escanilla Formation, south-central Pyrenees" (PDF). Geological Society of America Bulletin. 126 (3–4): 585–599. Bibcode:2014GSAB..126..585M. doi:10.1130/B30954.1.

=== Technical books ===
- Allen, P. A.; Homewood, P., eds. (1986). Foreland Basins (Special Publication 8 of the IAS). John Wiley & Sons. ISBN 978-0-632-01732-4.
  - 1990 2nd edition
  - Foreland Basins (3rd ed.). 8 April 2009. ISBN 978-1-4443-0382-7.
- Allen, Philip A.; Allen, John R. (1990). Basin Analysis: Principles and Applications (1st ed.). Blackwell Scientific Publications. ISBN 0632024232.
  - Basin Analysis: Principles and Applications (2nd ed.). Blackwell. 2005.
  - Basin Analysis: Principles and Application to Petroleum Play Assessment (3rd ed.). John Wiley & Sons. 30 May 2013. ISBN 978-1-118-45030-7.
- Allen, Philip A. (27 May 2009). Earth Surface Processes. John Wiley & Sons. ISBN 978-1-4443-1356-7.
- Allen, Philip A. (2017). Sediment routing systems: the fate of sediment from source to sink. Cambridge University Press. ISBN 9781107091993. LCCN 2017014847.

=== Popular books ===
- Allen, P. A. (2014). Acts of God: Weighing Biblical Events with Natural Science. ISBN 1500253057.
- Allen, P. A. (2014). Earth Dramas: Ancient Myths and Modern Controversies. ISBN 1499262434.
- Allen, P. A. (2023). Oasis Earth: The Divine Masterpiece of Creation. ISBN 1446655067.
