= C. Kevin Boyce =

American university teacher

Kevin Boyce
- Citizenship: United States
- Education: California Institute of Technology B.S. (1995), Harvard University Ph.D. (2001)
- Awards: Charles Schuchert Award (2011); MacArthur Fellowship (2013)
- Scientific career
- Fields: Paleobotany

C. Kevin Boyce is a paleobotanist. He is best known for winning a MacArthur Award in 2013. Boyce's work deals with the relationship between current and past ecosystems. Prior to his employment at Stanford, Boyce was associated with the University of Chicago.

== Papers ==
- D’Antonio, Michael P.; Ibarra, Daniel E.; Boyce, Charles Kevin (28 October 2019). "Land plant evolution decreased, rather than increased, weathering rates". Geology. 48 (1): 29–33. doi:10.1130/G46776.1. ISSN 0091-7613 – via GeoScienceWorld.
- Boyce, Charles Kevin; Zwieniecki, Maciej A. (26 June 2012). "Leaf fossil record suggests limited influence of atmospheric CO 2 on terrestrial productivity prior to angiosperm evolution". Proceedings of the National Academy of Sciences of the United States of America. 109 (26): 10403–10408. doi:10.1073/pnas.1203769109. ISSN 0027-8424. PMC 3387114. PMID 22689947.
- Boyce, Charles Kevin; Lee, Jung-Eun (1 June 2011). "Could Land Plant Evolution Have Fed the Marine Revolution?". Paleontological Research. 15 (2): 100–105. Bibcode:2011PalRe..15..100B. doi:10.2517/1342-8144-15.2.100. ISSN 1342-8144 – via BioOne Digital Library.
