= Anne Raymond =

American paleontologist (born 1955)

Anne L. Raymond (born 1955) is an American paleontologist who is a professor of paleontology and geobiology at Texas A&M University. She has served as the president of the Paleontological Society since 2024. She was elected a fellow of the Paleontological Society and the Geological Society of America in 2015 and 2020 respectively.

Raymond earned an A.B. from Harvard College in 1977. She completed a Ph.D. at the University of Chicago in 1983. Her dissertation was titled, Peat Taphonomy of Recent Mangrove Peats and Upper Carboniferous Coal-Ball Peats. T. J. M. Schopf was her doctoral advisor.
