= William Joscelyn Arkell =

British geologist and palaeontologist

William Joscelyn Arkell FRS FGS
- Born: 9 June 1904; Highworth, Wiltshire, England
- Died: 18 April 1958 (aged 53); Cambridge, England
- Education: New College, Oxford
- Known for: Jurassic geology
- Awards: Mary Clark Thompson Medal (1944); Lyell Medal (1949); Fellow of the Royal Society (1947)
- Scientific career
- Fields: Jurassic palaeontology and stratigraphy
- Workplaces: University of Oxford; University of Cambridge
- Doctoral advisor: James Archibald Douglas
- Doctoral students: Martin J. S. Rudwick

William Joscelyn Arkell (9 June 1904 – 18 April 1958) was a British geologist and palaeontologist, regarded as the leading authority on the Jurassic Period during the middle part of the 20th century.

== Childhood ==
Arkell was born in Highworth, Wiltshire, the youngest of a family of seven. His father, James Arkell was a partner in the prosperous family business Arkell's Brewery (which is still family owned today). His mother, Laura Jane Arkell, was an artist of noted ability.

He developed a deep love of the English countryside from an early age, perhaps gained from long family summer holidays spent at Swanage, Dorset. He was later educated at Wellington College in Berkshire, where his ability in Natural History was recognised and he was able to devote significant time to develop his knowledge of this subject. He was a regular prize winner for his natural history essays, one of which was a treatise on the Dorset Robber Flies (Asilidae). He privately published a set of poems, Seven Poems, that reflected his love of nature and the outdoors.

== Student life ==
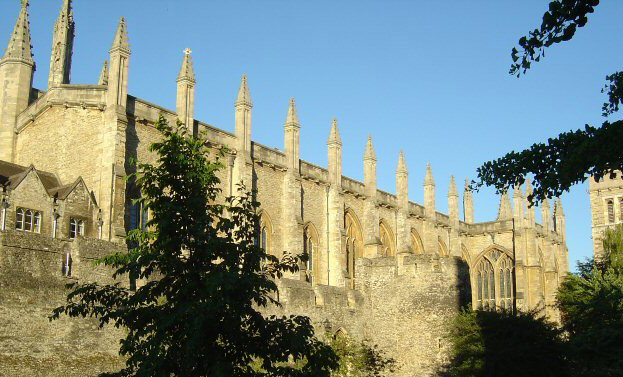
New College, Oxford

In October 1922, at the second attempt (after failing the Latin examination), Arkell was admitted to New College, Oxford. He had initially intended to read entomology but despite being tutored by the great Julian Huxley, he decided that his career lay in geology and palaeontology. In 1925 he graduated with First Class Honours in geology. He remained at the University of Oxford after being awarded a Burdett-Coutts research scholarship. His research topic involved the taxonomy of the bivalves from the Upper Jurassic Corallian beds of England. For this and other papers on the Jurassic of Southern England he was awarded a D Phil in 1928.

Whilst undertaking his doctoral research, Arkell spent four winter seasons (1926–1930) alongside K. S. Sandford, investigating evidence of Palaeolithic human remains in the Nile valley of Egypt in association with the University of Chicago. Four notable monographs, authored jointly with Sandford and published by Chicago's Oriental Institute were the result of this work.

== Geological research ==
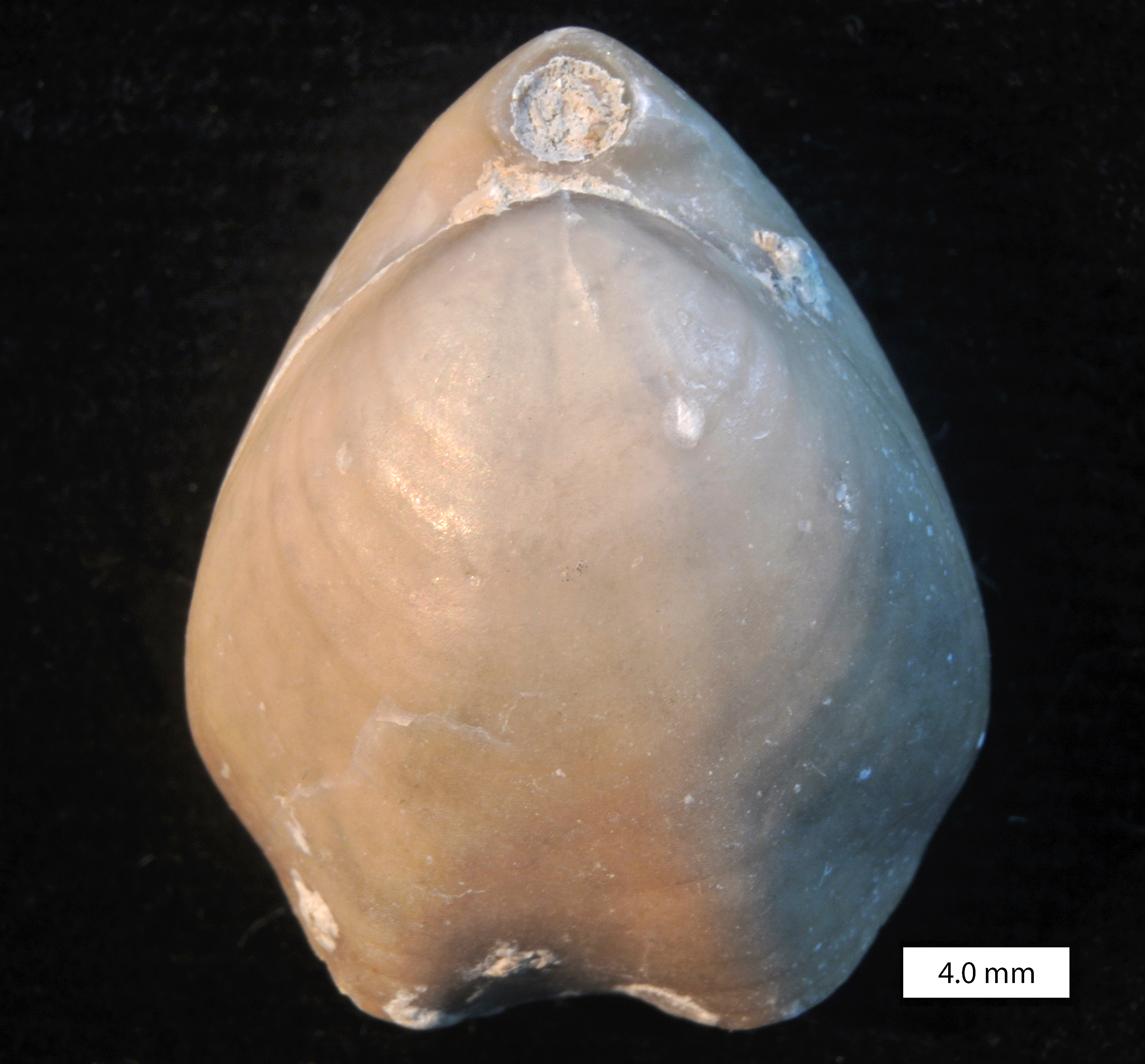
The Middle Jurassic brachiopod Cererithyris arkelli Almeras, 1970, named after Arkell

Arkell was awarded a lectureship in geology at New College, Oxford in 1927, and was made a senior research fellow of that college in 1929. With few teaching or administrative duties, he was able to devote almost all his time to research. This culminated with the publication in 1933 of The Jurassic System of Great Britain, a 681-page work which critically examined and consolidated all previous work on the Jurassic, including the formations described by the pioneer of British geology, William Smith, in the 19th century. It established Arkell (at age 29) as an authority on the Jurassic.

He also published extensively on the Upper Jurassic reef deposits (the Coral Rag) of England. He was an expert on the use of Jurassic limestones as building materials, and his research into the many different types of limestone used in the buildings of Oxford would result in publication of a book in 1947. The often obscure terminology used by miners and quarrymen was clarified by his dictionary of rock terms (1953). Arkell was interested in the tectonic history of Southern England, particularly with reference to the highly folded beds of the Isle of Purbeck. He contributed to reports published by the British Geological Survey, especially around the area of Weymouth and Portland.

The Second World War interrupted his research in 1941, and Arkell worked for the Ministry of Transport in London while bombing of that city was at its most intense. In 1943 he became seriously ill, spending five months in hospital after a pneumothorax operation.

== University of Cambridge ==
After demobilisation at the end of the war, Arkell accepted a senior research fellowship at Trinity College, Cambridge, holding an office at the Sedgwick Museum. In this time Arkell began to work on the use of ammonites as zone fossils in Jurassic stratigraphy and became the leading expert on this specialist area. He was inundated with fossils for identification, particularly from oil companies. As a consequence, he travelled widely in the Middle East, examining many Jurassic exposures from this area.

Arkell then consolidated his knowledge of the Jurassic and published Jurassic Geology of the World in 1956. The large, detailed volume to this day remains an influential text in the discipline.

== Personal life ==
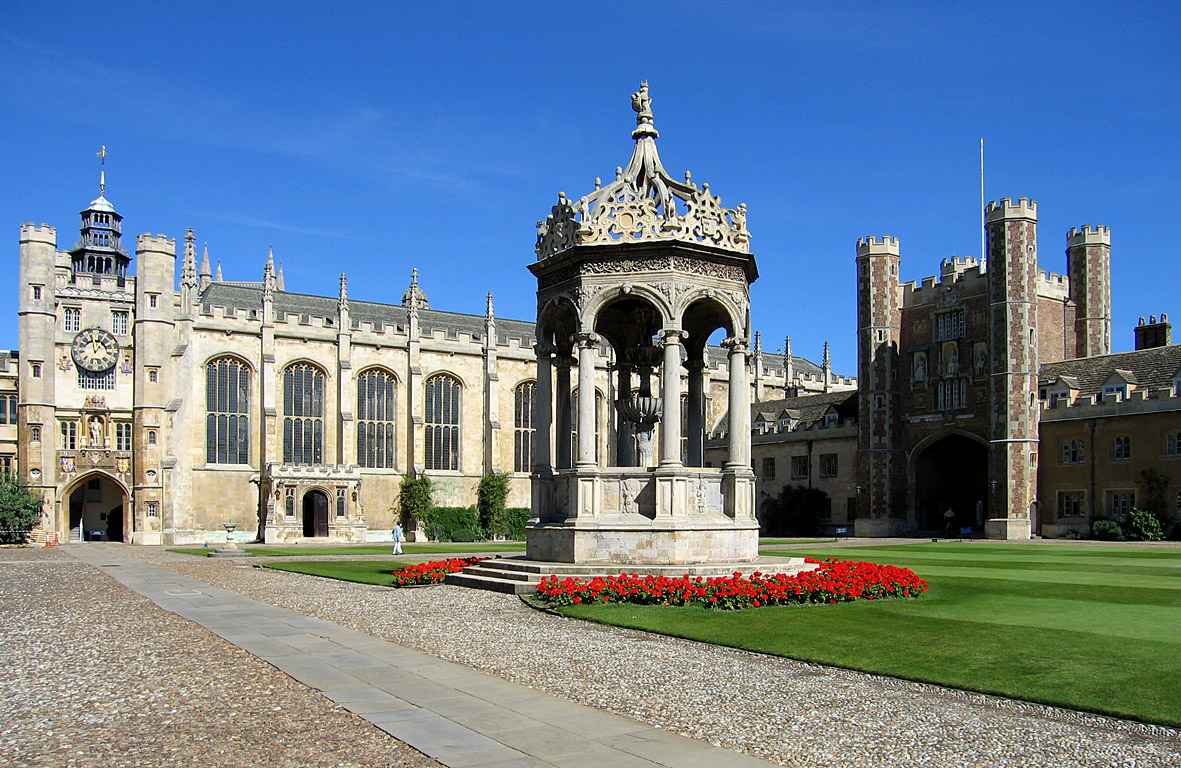
Great Court at Trinity college, Cambridge

Arkell married Ruby Percival in 1929 and bought a large house at Cumnor, near Oxford, before moving to Cambridge in 1949. They had three sons, born between 1932 and 1937. They also established a holiday home at Ringstead Bay in Dorset. Through his link with the family brewery business, Arkell was independently wealthy.

Arkell had a large frame and height – he was 6 feet 4 inches (1.93 m) tall – but was never a well man. In the autumn of 1956 he suffered a severe stroke which left him partially paralysed and with double vision; this was a detriment to his Sunday hobby of watercolour painting. Despite this his determination to continue his work and correspondence at the University of Cambridge continued. He suffered a second stroke on 18 April 1958 and died several hours later.

== Awards and honours ==
Arkell received a D Sc from the University of Oxford in 1934. In 1944 he received the Mary Clark Thompson Medal from the United States National Academy of Sciences. He was elected a Fellow of the Royal Society (FRS) in 1947. Arkell was awarded the Lyell Medal by the Geological Society of London in 1949, and the Leopold von Buch medal of the German Geological Society in 1953.

== Works ==
- Sandford, K.S.; Arkell, W.J. (1929). Paleolithic Man and the Nile-Faiyum Divide: A Study of the Region During Pliocene and Pleistocene Times. Oriental Institute publications. University of Chicago Press. ISBN 978-0-226-62104-3.
- Arkell, W. J. (1933). The Jurassic System in Great Britain. Oxford: Clarendon Press.
- Arkell, W. J. (1935). "The Portland beds of the Dorset mainland". Proceedings of the Geologists' Association. 46 (3). London: Geologists' Association: 301–IN10. Bibcode:1935PrGA...46..301A. doi:10.1016/s0016-7878(35)80002-3.
- Arkell, W. J. (1936). "The Tectonics of the Purbeck and Ridgeway faults in Dorset". Geological Magazine. 73 (3). Cambridge: Cambridge University Press: 97–118. Bibcode:1936GeoM...73...97A. doi:10.1017/s0016756800091354. S2CID 222601315.
- Richardson, Linsdall; Arkell, W. J.; Dines, H. G. (1946). Geology of the Country Around Witney: Explanation of Sheet 236. Memoirs of the Geological Survey of Great Britain: England and Wales. HMSO.
- Arkell, W. J. (1947). Oxford Stone. London: Faber and Faber. OL 16491967M.
- Arkell, W. J. (1948). "The building-stones of Blenheim Palace, Cornbury Park, Glympton Park and Heythrop House, Oxfordshire". Oxoniensia. XIII. Oxford Architectural and Historical Society: 49–54. ISSN 0308-5562.
- Arkell, W. J.; Wright, C. W.; Osborne White, H. J. (1947). Geology of the Country around Weymouth, Swanage, Corfe and Lulworth: Explanation Of Sheets 341, 342, 343 With Small Portions Of Sheets 327, 328, 329. Memoirs of the Geological Survey of Great Britain: England and Wales. HMSO.
- Arkell, W.J.; Tomkeieff, S.I. (1953). English Rock Terms: Chiefly as Used by Miners and Quarrymen. Oxford University Press. ISBN 978-0-19-713101-5.
- Arkell, W. J. (1956). Jurassic Geology of the World. New York; Edinburgh: Hafner Publishing Co; Oliver & Boyd – via Internet Archive.
