= Craig Call Black =

American paleontologist (1932–1998)

- Born: May 28, 1932; Peking
- Died: December 5, 1998 (aged 66); Albuquerque, New Mexico
- Citizenship: American
- Scientific career
- Fields: paleontologist

Craig Call Black (1932–1998) was an American paleontologist noted for his studies of the vertebrate mammals of the Ice Age. He served as the director of the Museum of Texas Tech University 1972–1975, Carnegie Museum of Natural History 1975-1982 and the Natural History Museum of Los Angeles County 1982–1994. In 1982, President Ronald Reagan appointed him to serve on the National Museum Services Board. In 1985, Reagan nominated him to serve on the National Science Board for a period of five years succeeding David V. Ragone. In 1991, President George H. W. Bush appointed him to serve on the Environment for the Americas Board.

== Early life ==
Black was born in Peking, China on May 28, 1932, to Commander Dr. Arthur P. Black, US Navy, and Mary Nichols Black, of El Paso, Texas. He graduated from Kent School in 1950 and received a bachelor's degree from Amherst College in 1954 and a master's degree in 1957. He received a PhD from Harvard University in 1962.

== Career ==
Black served as the president of the American Association of Museums, the Association of Science Museum Directors, Society of Vertebrate Paleontology (1970–1971) and the Paleontological Society (1995). He was a fellow of the Geological Society of America and a member of the Society for the Study of Evolution. While serving at the University of Kansas Natural History Museum in 1972, he is credited with naming the owl species E. Martinellii after paleontologist Jorge Martinelli who discovered the fossil remains. He was recognized for his support of archaeological work.

In 1987 the Blacks hosted Andre Kapitsa, the deputy secretary general of the Soviet Union's Academy of Sciences, at their home.

== Work ==
Black authored a number of works. Select publications are listed below:

- A Review of the North American Tertiary Sciuridae, 1963
- A new Pareumys (Rodentia: cylindrodontidae) from the Duchesne River Formation, Utah, 1970
- History and prehistory of the Lubbock Lake site, 1974
- Papers on Fossil Rodents in Honor of Albert Elmer Wood (with Mary R. Dawson), 1989
