= Walter C. Sweet =

American paleontologist

Walter C. Sweet (17 October 1927 in Denver, Colorado – 4 December 2015 in Tucson, Arizona) was an American paleontologist.

He was a Chief Panderer of the Pander Society, an informal organisation founded in 1967 for the promotion of the study of conodont palaeontology.

In 1984, he was president of the Paleontological Society, an international organisation devoted to the promotion of paleontology.

In 1979, he described the conodont genus Culumbodina. In 1988, he described the conodont order Proconodontida and the conodont family Gnathodontidae.

== Awards and tributes ==
He received the Pander Medal, the Paleontological Society Medal in 1994 and the Raymond C. Moore Medal in 1988.

The conodont genus Sweetognathus is named in his honour.
