= William I. Ausich =

American paleontologist

William I. Ausich is an American paleontologist. He is Academy Professor of Earth Sciences at Ohio State University and Director of the Orton Geological Museum.

Ausich received the Charles Schuchert Award of the Paleontological Society for early career researchers in 1990. He was awarded the Raymond C. Moore Medal by the Society for Sedimentary Geology in 2018.
