= Steven M. Holland (paleontologist) =

American paleontologist and geologist

- Born: November 22, 1962 (age 63); United States
- Education: BS University of Cincinnati; PhD University of Chicago
- Awards: Charles Schuchert Award; James Lee Wilson Award
- Scientific career
- Fields: Paleontology; Paleobiology; Geology
- Workplaces: University of Georgia

Steven M. Holland (born November 22, 1962) is an American paleontologist and geologist at the University of Georgia. His research focuses on stratigraphic paleobiology, the application of event and sequence stratigraphy to a paleobiological understanding of the fossil record. With Mark Patzkowsky, he coauthored the book Stratigraphic Paleobiology.

== Education ==
Holland was educated at the University of Cincinnati, where he earned his Bachelor of Science degree in 1985. He completed his graduate work in Geophysical Sciences at the University of Chicago with a Ph.D. in 1990, under the advisement of Susan Kidwell. He conducted postdoctoral research at the Ohio State University with Dork Sahagian. In 1991 he was hired by the University of Georgia, where he is currently Professor in the Department of Geology.

== Research ==
Steven Holland's research interests combine sequence stratigraphy and paleobiology. He uses a mixture of computer simulation, field work, and multivariate data analysis to understand how the processes of sediment accumulation control the expression of the fossil record, and how to use this understanding to interpret the fossil record. This approach suggests that most ancient mass extinction events took place over hundreds of thousands of years, rather than as brief events.

== Awards ==
In 2000 the Society for Sedimentary Geology awarded Holland the James Lee Wilson Award for "excellence in sedimentary geology by a young scientist". In 2003 he received the Charles Schuchert Award, which is given by the Paleontological Society to persons under 40 "whose work reflects excellence and promise in paleontology". He has been elected Councilor for Paleontology of the Society for Sedimentary Geology, and President of the Paleontological Society.
