= Jere H. Lipps =

American paleontologist

- Born: August 28, 1939 (age 87); Los Angeles, California
- Citizenship: United States
- Education: University of California, Los Angeles
- Scientific career
- Fields: paleontology
- Workplaces: University of California, Berkeley, University of California Museum of Paleontology, Dr. John D. Cooper Archaeological and Paleontological Center
- Website: ib.berkeley.edu/people/faculty/lippsj

Jere Henry Lipps (August 28, 1939) is Professor of the Graduate School, University of California, Berkeley, and Curator of Paleontology at the University of California Museum of Paleontology. Lipps was the ninth Director of the museum (1989–1997) and chair of the department of Integrative Biology at Berkeley (1991–1994). He served as president of the Paleontological Society in 1997, and the Cushman Foundation for Foraminiferal Research Inc. three times

== Early life ==
Lipps was born in Los Angeles at the Queen of Angels Hospital and grew up in the Los Angeles neighborhood of Eagle Rock. He climbed the hills of Eagle Rock and became interested in rocks, fossils and animals at a young age. His father took him on mineralogy field trips all over Southern California. In sixth grade he wrote that he wanted to be a geologist.

== Education ==
After graduating from Eagle Rock High School he attended the University of California, Los Angeles, earning a B.A. and later a Ph.D. from UCLA in 1966. During this time, he became involved in paleontological research on the Southern California Channel Islands, collecting fossils and documenting the geology on six of the eight islands. His special interests were the Pleistocene history of California, the paleoecology of Miocene whale-bearing deposits in western North America, and planktonic foraminiferal evolution and biostratigraphy in California, the topic of his PhD dissertation.

== Research ==
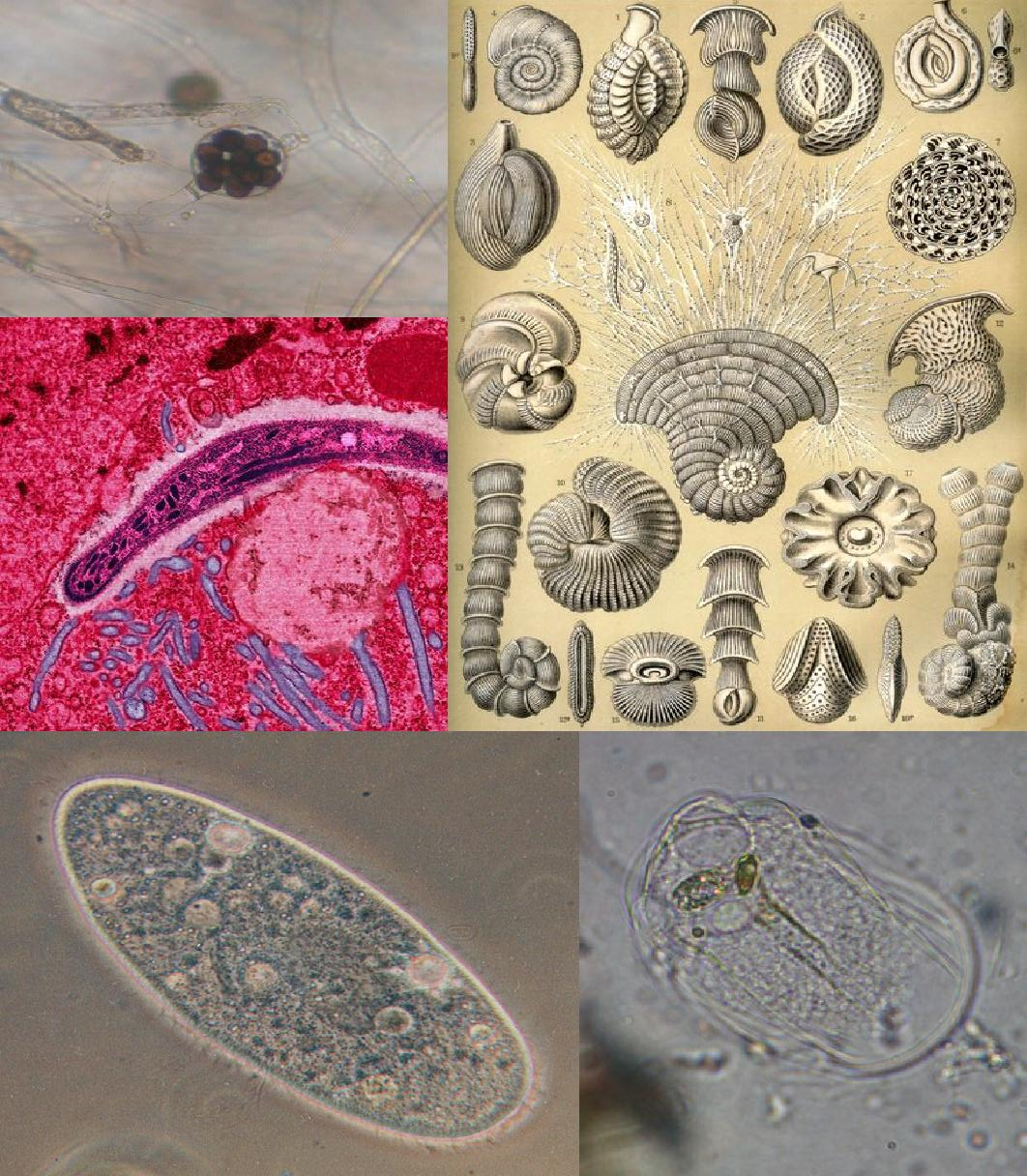
Protist collage

After receiving his Ph.D. Lipps moved to the University of California, Davis and began his career in the Department of Geology. Lipps's research concerns the evolutionary biology and ecology of marine organisms, protists in particular. This involves studies of modern species and of particular problems in the fossil record. As of 2017, he is participating in studies concerning the biology and molecular phylogeny of coral reefs (Papua New Guinea, Enewetak Atoll, French Polynesia) and California foraminifera with the aim of better understanding the fossil record of these forms and ecosystems. Paleobiologic projects include the evolution of the earliest shelled protists in the Precambrian and Cambrian, the biologic constraints on mass extinctions and evolutionary radiations, and the evolutionary history and future of reefs. These projects are mostly field oriented utilizing SCUBA in the modern studies and extended geologic work in the paleobiologic studies.

Lipps was leader of two projects on Antarctic marine ecology for the United States Antarctic Program between 1971 and 1981. During Ross Ice Shelf project Lipps took drilled cores and took bottom samples of the sea floor from beneath the ice. On the Antarctic Peninsula, he and his team used dry suits to dive in icy waters, frequently encountering aggressive leopard seals. He was the leader of the biology team for the Ross Ice Shelf Project which drilled a hole through the 420m thick ice shelf and recovered organisms on the sea floor some 200m below the base of the Shelf at the southernmost marine locality in the world. As a result of this research, he has an island named for him in Antarctica called Lipps Island.

From 1985 to 1989, he worked in Papua New Guinea on coral reef ecology, supplementing many years of previous work on reefs elsewhere in the world. Since then his reef work involves localities in Australia, the Society Islands, the Egyptian Red Sea, Fiji, and other Pacific islands. His paleontological research involves fossil reefs, the Ediacara biota in Russia, Australia, Newfoundland, and California, extinction dynamics in open-ocean ecosystems, and the paleontology of the Galápagos Islands and sites in California.

Lipps is co-author (with Philip W. Signor) of the Signor–Lipps effect, a paleontological principle which states that since the fossil record of organisms is never complete, because neither the first nor the last organism in a given taxon will be recorded as a fossil, hence the complete range in time and the rock record can never be known.

Jere studied and taught about astrobiology, publishing papers on the possibility of past and present life on Mars and Europa as well as icy bodies in the Universe anywhere.

== Skepticism and critical thinking ==
Jere has given lectures about global warming caused by humans. He stated that cow farms are a big producer of the greenhouse gas methane. He has stated that climate change is factually supported enough that it should not be a hypothesis but a theory. In an open letter he wrote to Charles Darwin about the advances we have made since his death on the celebration of Darwin's 200th birthday. He also wrote about his concern with our population growth and global warming. In it he stated

Global warming is perhaps the most serious problem facing the world right now. It is affecting us all—from little things like changing growing seasons (even seed packages we buy have been revised to show the warmer trends) to big ones like more hurricanes and tornados, [sic] dying reefs and species, biodiversity declines, sea level rise, and many others. Some humans on those low atolls you saw in the Pacific Ocean have been forced to move already because of rising sea level caused by melting ice.

He wrote an article on critical thinking in which he stated

Everyone uses science daily in their lives. We usually call it common sense, or we fail to recognize it at all. Common sense is a set of conclusions based on everyday experiences. They are repeated time and again, and people come to accept the conclusions! Crossing a street is a scientific experiment. You gather the data — width of street, number of cars, speed of cars, obstacles in the path — and develop the hypothesis that you can or cannot reach the other side safely.

He further wrote guidelines on judging authority for the Committee for Skeptical Inquiry stating

Most important, does the authority use the skills of critical thinking and evidential reasoning listed in tables 1 and 2? If not, question him using those very skills yourself, and don't believe him until he produces the evidence required.

At a keynote address he said

Why do we spend $29 billion per year on standard medicine and another almost equal amount ($27 billion) on alternative medicines that cannot be demonstrated scientifically to be effective? Why do people pay outrageous sums of money for weird solutions to their problems? Because they do not understand some very basic ways of dealing with the real world.

== Honors ==
Along with being the namesake for Lipps Island he is also the namesake for the foraminiferal genus Lippsina and the foraminiferal species Cancris lippsi, Dentalina lippsi and Acarotrochus lippsi.
