= Paleobiology (journal) =

- Discipline: Paleobiology
- Language: English

Publication details
- History: 1975–present
- Publisher: The Paleontological Society (US)
- Frequency: Quarterly
- Impact factor: 2.886 (2016)

Standard abbreviations
- ISO 4: Paleobiology

Indexing
- ISSN: 0094-8373
- JSTOR: 00948373

Links
- Paleontological Society's journal homepage; GeoScienceWorld access

Paleobiology is a scientific journal promoting the integration of biology and conventional paleontology, with emphasis placed on biological or paleobiological processes and patterns. It attracts papers of interest to more than one discipline, and occasionally publishes research on recent organisms when this is of interest to paleontologists.

A special 25th anniversary issue of the journal titled "Deep Time: Paleobiology's Perspective" was published in 2000 by editors Douglas H. Erwin and Scott L. Wing as a supplement to Volume 26(4). It comprises 15 papers reviewing the contemporary advances and continued debates within the field.
