= Lipps Island =

Island in the Palmer Archipelago, Antarctica

- Location within Antarctica

Geography
- Location: Antarctica
- Coordinates: 64°46′S 64°07′W
- Archipelago: Palmer Archipelago

Administration
- Administered under the Antarctic Treaty System

Demographics
- Population: Uninhabited

Lipps Island is a small rocky island 0.37 kilometres (0.2 nmi) west of Litchfield Island, off the southwest coast of Anvers Island, off the Antarctic Peninsula. Lipps Island was named by the United States Advisory Committee on Antarctic Names (US-ACAN) for Dr. Jere H. Lipps, leader (1971–1974) of the United States Antarctic Research Program (USARP) team making studies of shallow water benthic foraminifera and other organisms along Antarctic Peninsula, including this area. Lipps Island is located in Arthur Harbor near the US Antarctic Research Program's Palmer Station.

== See also ==
- Composite Antarctic Gazetteer
- List of Antarctic and sub-Antarctic islands
- List of Antarctic islands south of 60° S
- SCAR
- Territorial claims in Antarctica
