= David Jablonski =

American paleontologist

- Born: David Ira Jablonski; 1953 (age 72–73)
- Education: Columbia University; Yale University
- Awards: Charles Schuchert Award (1988); Member of the National Academy of Sciences (2010)
- Scientific career
- Workplaces: University of Chicago; American Museum of Natural History; University of California, Santa Barbara; University of California, Berkeley
- Thesis: Paleoecology, Paleobiogeography, and Evolutionary Patterns of Late Cretaceous Gulf and Atlantic Coastal Plain Mollusks (1979)
- Website: geosci.uchicago.edu/people/david-jablonski

David Ira Jablonski (born 1953) is an American professor of geophysical sciences at the University of Chicago. His research focuses upon the ecology and biogeography of the origin of major novelties, the evolutionary role of mass extinctions—in particular the Cretaceous–Paleogene extinction event—and other large-scale processes in the history of life.

Jablonksi is a proponent of the extended evolutionary synthesis.

== Education ==
Jablonski was educated at Columbia University (earning his Bachelor of Arts degree in 1974) and completed his graduate work at Yale University (with his Master of Science degree in 1976 and Ph.D. in 1979). As an undergraduate he worked at the American Museum of Natural History in the City of New York, NY. Then continued postdoctoral research at the University of California, Santa Barbara and the University of California, Berkeley. In 1985, he was hired by the University of Chicago.

== Awards ==
In 1988, the Paleontological Society awarded Jablonski with the Charles Schuchert Award, which is given to persons under 40 "whose work reflects excellence and promise in paleontology". In 2004, he received the Quantrell Award.

In 2010, he was elected to the National Academy of Sciences. In 2017, the Paleontological Society awarded him their most prestigious prize, the Paleontological Society Medal
