= Maria Lipp =

German chemist

Maria Lipp (6 April 1892 in Stolberg (Rhineland) – 12 December 1966 in Aachen) was a German organic chemist. She was the first female doctoral student, professor, and ordinary professor at the RWTH Aachen University.

Maria Lipp (left) is awarded the Order of Merit of the Federal Republic of Germany.

== Life ==
Lipp was born in Stolberg (Rheinland) as the daughter of Karl Savelsberg and Friederike de Nys. She was later adopted by the chemist Julius Bredt. In 1913, she started studying chemistry at the TH Aachen. She completed her diploma with distinction in 1917 and was the first female doctoral student at the TH Aachen. She completed her doctorate (Dr.-Ing.) with distinction in 1918 and her habilitation in organic chemistry again at the TH Aachen in 1923. In 1925, she married Peter Lipp, a professor for organic chemistry at the TH Aachen. She became an extraordinary professor at the TH Aachen in 1938. During the Second World War, the institute for organic chemistry at the TH Aachen was destroyed. This complicated her research until after the Second World War. Her husband died in 1947. From 1949 to 1960, she was an ordinary professor for organic chemistry. In 1960, she became an emeritus professor. Her cousin Gertrud Savelsberg was an economist.

== Research ==
Lipp's research focused on organic chemistry.

== Awards ==
In 1962, she was awarded the Order of Merit of the Federal Republic of Germany for her accomplishments to rebuild the organic chemistry institute at the TH Aachen after the Second World War. A street in Aachen is named after her.

== Selected publications ==
- Maria Lipp, Richard Anschütz, Adolf Butenandt: Chemie der Kohlenstoffverbindungen oder organische Chemie – Carbocyclische Verbindungen, Naturstoffe und Freie Organische Radikale; Zweiter Band, Erste Hälfte: Alicyclische Verbindungen und Naturstoffe, 1935
- Darstellung reaktionsfähiger Verbindungen des Camphansystems und Versuche zu deren Fluorierung, Köln: Westdt. Verl., 1957
- Franz Dallacker, Karl-Werner Glombitza, Maria Lipp: Derivate des Methylendioxybenzols, IV. Reaktionen des 4.5-Methylendioxy-phthalaldehyds, in: Justus Liebigs Annalen der Chemie, Volume 643, 1961
- Franz Dallacker, Karl-Werner Glombitza, Maria Lipp: Derivate des Methylendioxybenzols, V. Über die Synthese des 4.5-Methylendioxyisophthalalkohols und über polymere Methylendioxyphenyl-Verbindungen, in: Justus Liebigs Annalen der Chemie, Volume 643, 1961
- Franz Dallacker, Jozef Thoma, Maria Lipp: Derivate des Methylendioxybenzols, X. Darstellung und Reaktionen von -Hydroxy-ketonen, in: Justus Liebigs Annalen der Chemie, Volume 663, 1963
- Franz Dallacker, Horst Pauling, Maria Lipp: Über Reaktionen der Terebinsäure, in: Justus Liebigs Annalen der Chemie, Volume 663, 1963
- Franz Dallacker, Klaus Ulrichs, Maria Lipp: Anwendung der Wittig-Reaktion auf bi- und tricyclische Terpene, in: Justus Liebigs Annalen der Chemie, Volume 667, 1963
