= John Mason Clarke =

American paleontologist

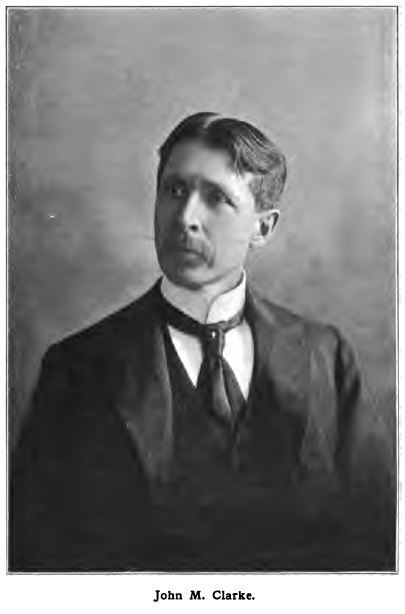
- Born: April 15, 1857; Canandaigua, New York
- Died: May 29, 1925 (aged 68); Albany, New York
- Education: Amherst College
- Occupation: Paleontologist
- Known for: New York state paleontologist

John Mason Clarke (April 15, 1857 – May 29, 1925) was an American teacher, geologist and paleontologist.

== Early career ==
Born in Canandaigua, New York, the fifth of six children of Noah Turner Clarke and Laura Mason Merrill, he attended Canandaigua Academy where his father was teacher and principal. In 1873 he matriculated to Amherst College, where he graduated with a bachelor's degree in 1877. He returned to Canandaigua Academy and served as an instructor in various subjects. In 1879–1880 he worked as an assistant to Benjamin K. Emerson at Amherst, then he taught at the Utica Free Academy during 1880–1881. This was followed by work as an instructor at Smith College from 1881 to 1882, where he was made professor. During his second year at Smith, his first three scientific papers were published, concerning arthropods.

It was at this point that he traveled to Göttingen University in 1883, where he hoped to study for a doctorate. However, an accusation of heterodoxy by the President of Smith College led to the termination of his services there. As a consequence, he returned to the United States, where he resumed his teaching career at Massachusetts Agricultural College during 1884–1885. Out of work, he continued a study of the Upper Devonian, which he hoped to use for his dissertation. In January 1886 he became an assistant to James Hall at the New York State Museum of Natural History in Albany. He continued an association with the museum for the remainder of his career.

== Paleontology and geology ==
He married his first wife, Emma Juel Sill, on September 29, 1887; the couple had one son, Noah T. Clarke. In 1894 he was named professor of Geology and Mineralogy at the Rensselaer Polytechnic Institute. He married his second wife, Fannie V. Bosler, in 1895. Following the death of James Hall in 1898, Clarke was named New York State Paleontologist and was put in charge of a geological survey of New York. In 1904 he became the State Geologist and Paleontologist, Director of the State Museum, and Director of the Science Division of the Education Department. He was named the first president of the Paleontological Society in 1908, then served as vice president of the Geological Society of America in 1909 and its president in 1916.

John M. Clarke died in 1925 in Albany, New York. He was survived by his wife Fannie and son Noah. During his career he published 452 titles, of which around 300 are on the subject of geology or paleontology. Three genera and 42 species were named after him. He was awarded six honorary degrees and received offers from four universities to chair their departments of geology. The John Mason Clarke 1877 Fellowship was established by his son Noah to provide income for graduate studies in geology or paleontology.

== Honors and awards ==
- Hayden Memorial Geological Award, 1908.
- Elected Member of the United States National Academy of Sciences, 1909.
- Prix de Léonide Spindiaroff, International Geological Congress, 1910.
- Elected Member of the American Philosophical Society, 1911.
- Elected Member of the American Academy of Arts and Sciences, 1915.
- Gold medal, Permanent Wild Life Protection Fund, 1920.
- Mary Clark Thompson Medal, 1925.
- Honorary Ph.D. from the University of Marburg, 1898.
- Honorary LL.D. from Amherst College, 1902.
- Honorary Sc.D. from Colgate University, 1909.
- Honorary LL.D. from Johns Hopkins University, 1915.
- Honorary Sc.D. from the University of Chicago, 1916.
- Honorary Sc.D. from Princeton University, 1919.
- Wampum Keeper of the Iroquois Confederacy.
