= Oskar Lipp =

German politician (born 1995)

Member of the Landtag of Bavaria
- Incumbent
- Assumed office 30 October 2023

Personal details
- Born: 1995 (age 30–31) Ingolstadt
- Party: Alternative for Germany (since 2015)

Oskar Lipp (born 1995 in Ingolstadt) is a German politician serving as a member of the Landtag of Bavaria since 2023. He has been a member of the Alternative for Germany since 2015.
