= Henry W. Posamentier =

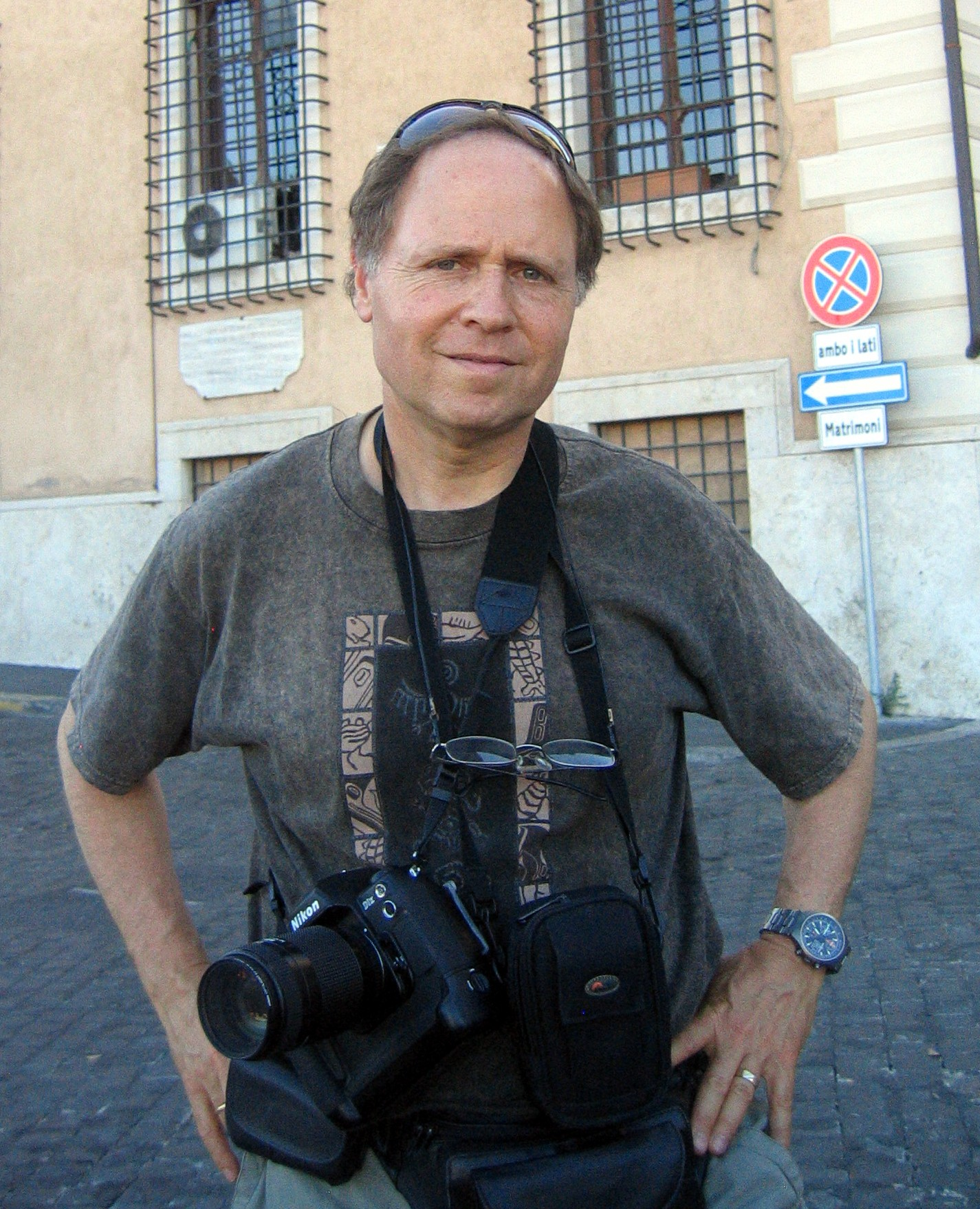
Henry Posamentier

Henry William Posamentier (born December 4, 1948) is an American geologist. He helped pioneer and develop the modern approach to sequence stratigraphy, blending the disciplines of sedimentology, stratigraphy, and depositional systems analysis, largely within the context of oil and gas exploration. During the past decade he pioneered and popularized the discipline of seismic geomorphology, which, when integrated with seismic stratigraphy, leverages both 2D and 3D seismic data to better understand the paleogeographic distribution of lithologies.

Posamentier is partially colorblind and prefers to view his seismic data in grayscale.

Posamentier was born in Manhattan in New York City, the son of Austrian-Jewish immigrants. He received his Bachelor of Science in geology in 1970 at the City College of New York. In 1973 he earned his Master of Arts in geology and in 1975 his Ph.D., both from Syracuse.

After a brief career in academia at Rider University (Assistant Professor of Geology (1974–1979), Posamentier joined the oil and gas industry, working for assorted leading oil and gas firms. In early 2014 he retired from Chevron Corporation in Houston, Texas, but he continues to consult for the industry. Among his accomplishments, he was a Fulbright Fellow to Austria (1971–1972); the AAPG Distinguished Lecturer to the United States (1992-1992), former Soviet Union (1996–1997), Middle East (1998–1999), and Europe (2005–2006); recipient of the Pettijohn Medal for excellence in sedimentology from the Society for Sedimentary geology (SEPM)(2008); recipient of the William Smith Medal for contributions to applied and economic aspects of geology from the Geological Society of London (2010); and the Robert Berg Award for Outstanding Petroleum Research (2012).

Posamentier has five children (Joshua, born 1976 and Jordan, born 1978, Michelle, born 1989, EP, born 1994, and Rebecca, born 1995). He is the brother of Alfred S. Posamentier, a notable American educator, and Evelyn Posamentier, a well-known poet. He presently resides with his wife, Ceri, in Bodega Bay, California.

== Books edited ==
- AAPG Memoir 58: Siliciclastic Sequence Stratigraphy: Recent Developments and Applications, 1993*Geological Society, London, Special Publication 277, Seismic Geomorphology: Applications to *Hydrocarbon Exploration and Production
- IAS Special Publication 18: Sequence Stratigraphy and Facies Associations, 1993
- NUNA Conference on High Resolution Sequence Stratigraphy, Proceedings Volume, 1991
- Second High Resolution Sequence Stratigraphy, Proceedings Volume, 1994
- SEPM Special Publication 42: Sea Level Change - an Integrated Approach, 1988
- SEPM Special Publication 76, Tropical Deltas of Southeast Asia, 2003
- SEPM Special Publication 84, Facies Models Revisited, 2006
- SEPM Special Publication (in press) Mass Transport Deposits
