= David White (geologist) =

American geologist (1862–1935)

(Charles) David White
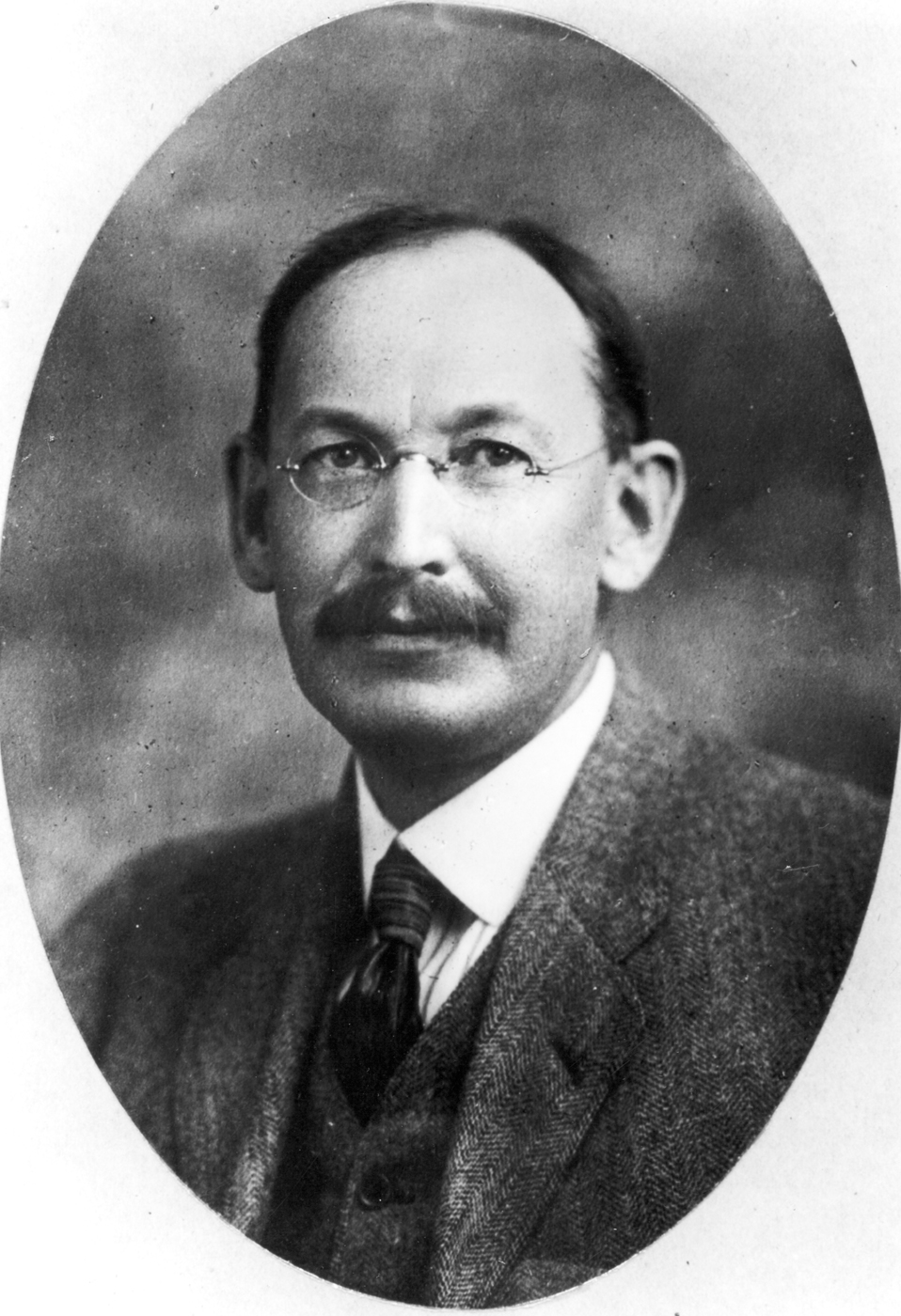
- Born: July 1, 1862; Palmyra, New York
- Died: February 7, 1935 (aged 72); Washington, D.C.
- Citizenship: American
- Education: Cornell University
- Known for: Chief Geologist, USGS
- Awards: Thompson Medal (1931); Charles Doolittle Walcott Medal (1934)
- Scientific career
- Fields: Geology, Paleobotany
- Author abbrev. (botany): C.D.White

Charles David White (July 1, 1862 – February 7, 1935), who normally went by his middle name, was an American geologist, born in Palmyra, New York.

He graduated from Cornell University in 1886, and in 1889 became a member of the United States Geological Survey. Eventually, he rose to be chief geologist.

In 1903 he became an associate curator of paleobotany at the Smithsonian Institution. He wrote numerous papers on geological and paleontological subjects.

The David White House, his home for 15 years, is a U.S. National Historic Landmark.

He made one of the most comprehensive studies on the Glossopteris Flora, the main component of the fossil deposits of mineral coal in Brazil.

David White was elected to the United States National Academy of Sciences in 1912, and both the American Academy of Arts and Sciences and the American Philosophical Society in 1921. He won the Thompson Medal in 1931 and the Walcott Medal in 1934. He was president of the Geological Society of America in 1923. He "himself considered that his structure-carbon ratio for the occurrence of oil and gas was his greatest scientific achievement."

== Publications ==
- Flora of the outlying Carboniferous basins of southwestern Missouri US Geological Survey Bulletin No. 98 (1893)
- Fossil flora of the lower coal measures of Missouri US Geological Survey Monograph No. 37 (1899)
- The geology of the Perry Basin in southeastern Maine with G.O. Smith. US Geological Survey Professional Paper No. 35 (1905)
- The effect of oxygen in coal US Geological Survey Bulletin No. 382 (1909)
- Shorter contributions to general geology, 1913 US Geological Survey Professional Paper No. 85 (1914)
- Reported that the US oil supply as of end of 1918 was 6.74 billion barrels. New York Times, October 7, 1919, page 26.
- White D (July 1928). "Algal deposits of Unkar Proterozoic age in the Grand Canyon, Arizona" (PDF). Proc Natl Acad Sci U S A. 14 (7): 597–600. Bibcode:1928PNAS...14..597W. doi:10.1073/pnas.14.7.597. PMC 1085618. PMID 16587371.
