= Daniel Fisher (paleontologist) =

American paleobiologist and mastodon extinction expert

Daniel Fisher is a paleontologist who studies paleobiology and the extinction of mastodons. He received his Ph.D. in Geological Sciences from Harvard University in 1975 and is the Claude W. Hibbard Collegiate Professor of Paleontology and the Director of the Museum of Paleontology at the University of Michigan. His research on mammoth tusks has helped to shape the common understanding of mammoth life.

He worked as a professor in the Department of Geological Sciences at the University of Rochester until 1979 when he moved to the University of Michigan to join the Department of Geological Sciences. In 2015, he led the dig of a gigantic mammoth from a farmer’s field in Michigan which is helping researchers to conclude about when humans first came to the Americas. He was on a NET Television-produced segment for the PBS series “NOVA scienceNOW” about Ice Age mammoths.
