= Charles Schuchert =

United States paleontologist (1858–1942)

- Born: July 3, 1858; Cincinnati, Ohio, USA
- Died: 20 November 1942 (aged 84)
- Education: Yale University; New York University; Harvard University
- Known for: Paleobiology
- Awards: Hayden Memorial Geological Award (1929); Mary Clark Thompson Medal (1934); Penrose Medal (1934)
- Scientific career
- Fields: Paleontology
- Doctoral students: Merton Yarwood Williams

Charles Schuchert (July 3, 1858 – November 20, 1942) was an American invertebrate paleontologist who was a leader in the development of paleogeography, the study of the distribution of lands and seas in the geological past.

== Biography ==
He was born in Cincinnati, Ohio, on July 3, 1858, to Philip and Agatha (Mueller) Schuchert. He received a common school education up to the age of thirteen, and then he spent a number of years working in his father's furniture business. Schuchert possessed an aptitude for scientific investigation, and in 1878 he began to attend meetings of the Cincinnati Society of Natural History. Here he developed a friendship with fellow Cincinnati native Edward Oscar Ulrich. The two collected and studied fossils from the Cincinnati area for ten years. In 1888, Schuchert moved to Albany, New York to apprentice under James Hall. He was preparator of fossils with Charles E. Beecher at Yale University from 1892 to 1893. He served on the United States Geological Survey from 1893 to 1894. After serving as curator of the U.S. National Museum from 1894 to 1904, Schuchert joined the Yale faculty, succeeding Beecher, the first invertebrate paleontologist there. He served as the director of the Peabody Museum of Natural History at Yale University from 1904 to 1923. He was the first president of the Paleontological Society in 1910. He served as president of The Geological Society of America in 1922.

Throughout his life, Schuchert amassed one of the largest brachiopod collections in the world. It is housed at the Peabody Museum. This collection has many notable specimens including a number of type specimens from his expansive work with G. Arthur Cooper, "Brachiopod genera of the suborders Orthoidea and Pentameroidea." There are also numerous specimens from the Salt Range and Anticosti Island.

Schuchert coined the term paleobiology in 1904. He was elected to the United States National Academy of Sciences in 1910, the American Philosophical Society in 1913, and the American Academy of Arts and Sciences in 1915. In 1934, Schuchert was awarded the Mary Clark Thompson Medal from the National Academy of Sciences.

Schuchert died in New Haven, Connecticut, on November 20, 1942.

The Schuchert Dal Formation and Cape Schuchert Formation in Greenland, as well as the Schuchert Valley in Jameson Land are named after him, as is the Charles Schuchert Award of the Paleontological Society, which is given annually to a paleontologist under 40 whose research shows exceptional promise.

== Works ==
- A synopsis of American fossil Brachiopoda, including bibliography and synonymy (Report). US Geological Survey. 1897. doi:10.3133/b87. hdl:2346/64666.
- Schuchert, C. (January 1, 1909). "Paleogeography of North America". Geological Society of America Bulletin. 20 (1). Geological Society of America: 427–606. Bibcode:1909GSAB...20..427S. doi:10.1130/gsab-20-427. hdl:2027/hvd.32044032783920. ISSN 0016-7606.
- Schuchert, Charles (1915). "Revision of Paleozoic Stelleroidea with special reference to North American Asteroidea". Bulletin of the United States National Museum (88). Smithsonian Institution: 1–311. doi:10.5479/si.03629236.88.1. hdl:2027/uc1.b3925908. ISSN 0362-9236.
- Textbook of Geology (1924)
- Historical Geology of North America (Three volumes – 1935–1943)
