= Douglas Erwin =

American paleontologist (born 1958)

Douglas H. Erwin
- Born: U.S.
- Education: Colgate University; University of California, Santa Barbara
- Awards: Charles Schuchert Award (1996)
- Scientific career
- Fields: Paleontology; Paleobiology
- Workplaces: Smithsonian National Museum of Natural History; Santa Fe Institute

Douglas Hamilton Erwin (born 1958) is a paleobiologist, Curator of Paleozoic Invertebrates at the Smithsonian National Museum of Natural History and Chair of the Faculty at the Santa Fe Institute. He is a member of the Editorial Board for Current Biology.

He has written two books: Extinction: How Life on Earth Nearly Ended 250 Million Years Ago in 2006, and The Great Paleozoic Crisis: Life and Death in the Permian in 1993. He co-wrote The Fossils of The Burgess Shale and The Cambrian Explosion. The Construction of Animal Biodiversity (2013). He is co-editor on 3 books: Deep Time: Paleobiology’s Perspective in 2000, Evolutionary Paleobiology: Essays in Honor of James W. Valentine in 1996, and New Approaches to Speciation in the Fossil Record in 1995.
