= Paleontological Society =

Organization

- Logo of the Paleontological Society
- Formation: 1908
- Members: 1564 (2014)
- Website: www.paleosoc.org

The Paleontological Society, formerly the Paleontological Society of America, is an international organisation devoted to the promotion of paleontology. The Society was founded in 1908 in Baltimore, Maryland, and was incorporated in April 1968 in the District of Columbia. The Society publishes the bi-monthly Journal of Paleontology and the quarterly Paleobiology, holds an annual meeting in the autumn in conjunction with the Geological Society of America, sponsors conferences and lectures, and provides grants and scholarships.

The Society has five geographic sections—Pacific Coast (founded March 1911), North-Central (founded May 1974), Northeastern (founded March 1977), Southeastern (founded November 1979), Rocky Mountain (founded October 1985), and South-Central (founded November 1988).

== Medals and awards ==
The Society recognizes distinguished accomplishments through three awards, one recognized by a medal, the other two by inscribed plaques normally presented annually:

- The Paleontological Society Medal, given since 1963, is the most prestigious honor bestowed by the Society and is awarded to a person whose eminence is based on advancement of knowledge in paleontology.
- The Charles Schuchert Award, given since 1973, is presented to a person under the age of 40 whose work reflects excellence and promise in the science of paleontology. The award is named for Charles Schuchert (1858–1942), an invertebrate paleontologist from Yale University who was a leader in the development of paleogeography.
- The Harrell L. Strimple Award, awarded since 1984, is given for contributions to paleontology by an amateur (someone who does not derive his/her livelihood from the study of fossils).

== See also ==
- John Mason Clarke, the society's first President
- List of presidents of the Paleontological Society
