= History of invertebrate paleozoology =

The history of invertebrate paleozoology (also spelled palaeozoology) differs from the history of paleontology in that the former usually emphasizes paleobiology and the paleoecology of extinct marine invertebrates, while the latter typically emphasizes the earth sciences and the sedimentary rock remains of terrestrial vertebrates.

The historical development of sub-vertebrate or non-vertebrate paleozoology may also be described as the history of invertebrate paleobiology or as the history of invertebrate paleontology. Nearly synonymous are the history of marine paleozoology, history of marine paleobiology, and history of marine paleontology – although the latter three may cover prehistoric fishes, sharks and simpler sea-dwelling organisms.

By far, invertebrate paleozoology is the easiest type of fossil collecting. Unlike the difficult-to-analyze and hard-to-interpret fossils of paleobotany (plants) and micropaleontology (microbes), and unlike the rarely found and poorly preserved skeletons of vertebrate paleontology, invertebrate fossils are usually both common and simple to identify. This is because many prehistoric invertebrates were hard-shelled molluscs, brachiopods, trilobites, bryozoans, crinoids or corals who were buried amid marine, sediment-preserving conditions; and therefore frequently fossilized.

== Origins of invertebrate paleozoology ==
Stone-Age people were without doubt the very first fossil collectors. Fossilized echinoderms have been found in Dunstable, Bedfordshire, central England, decorating a long-buried human skeleton; the prehistoric gravesite was Neolithic.

In widely separated, ancient societies around the globe, there once were many legends and tales of great floods, sea serpents, dragons, sea monsters, and invertebrate cryptozoa associated with so-called formed stones or figured stones of sea shells, fishes, corals, sea lilies, tracks, burrows, and trails. But, as civilizations progressed, these odd rocks began to be recognized as the fossilized remains and traces of prehistoric animals.

Scholars in ancient Greece produced some of the first scientific insights. Preceding Charles Darwin by two thousand years, Anaximander of Miletus (611 to 547 BCE) proposed a non-creationist, evolutionary theory of life. After Xenophanes of Colophon (576 to 480 BCE) scrutinized fossils of mollusks and other sea-dwelling creatures entombed in rock strata, Xenophanes pronounced that these fossils were evidence of once-living animals. Similarly, after examining fossil sea shells around 440 BCE, Empedocles of Akragas hypothesized that natural selection was occurring over vast, incomprehensible expanses of time.

By the middle of the 4th century BCE, Aristotle was composing On the Origins of Animals. Both he and his follower/successor Theophrastus speculated that plastic forces within the earth had turned animals into fossils of stone.

In the medieval Islamic world, Avicenna (979 to 1039 CE), in his The Book of Healing (1027), offered an explanation of how the stoniness of fossils was caused. Aristotle previously explained it in terms of vaporous exhalations, which Avicenna modified into the theory of petrifying fluids (succus lapidificatus), which was elaborated on by Albert of Saxony in the 14th century and accepted in some form by most naturalists by the 16th century.

Paleozoology was an area of interest in the European Renaissance of scientific inquiry. Significantly, Georgius Agricola - a founder of mineralology - discussed and illustrated invertebrate fossils in his De Natura Fossilium (1546 / 1558).

Although remembered mostly for his development of binomial nomenclature and biotic systematics in his Systema Naturae (1735), Carl Linnaeus also described many prehistoric marine invertebrates which he had observed within Silurian strata in his native Sweden. And while Jean-Étienne Guettard (1715 to 1786) discussed the marine paleoecology of ancient mollusks, more and more fossils were being reported from the Americas and Australasia.

Georges L. L. Buffon subsequently described seven geologic Epochs of Nature (1778) wherein he boldly argued that fossiliferous sedimentary strata proved that the world was at least 70,000 years old. In 1795 the very first geochronologic period – the Jurassic – was named.

== 19th-century developments ==
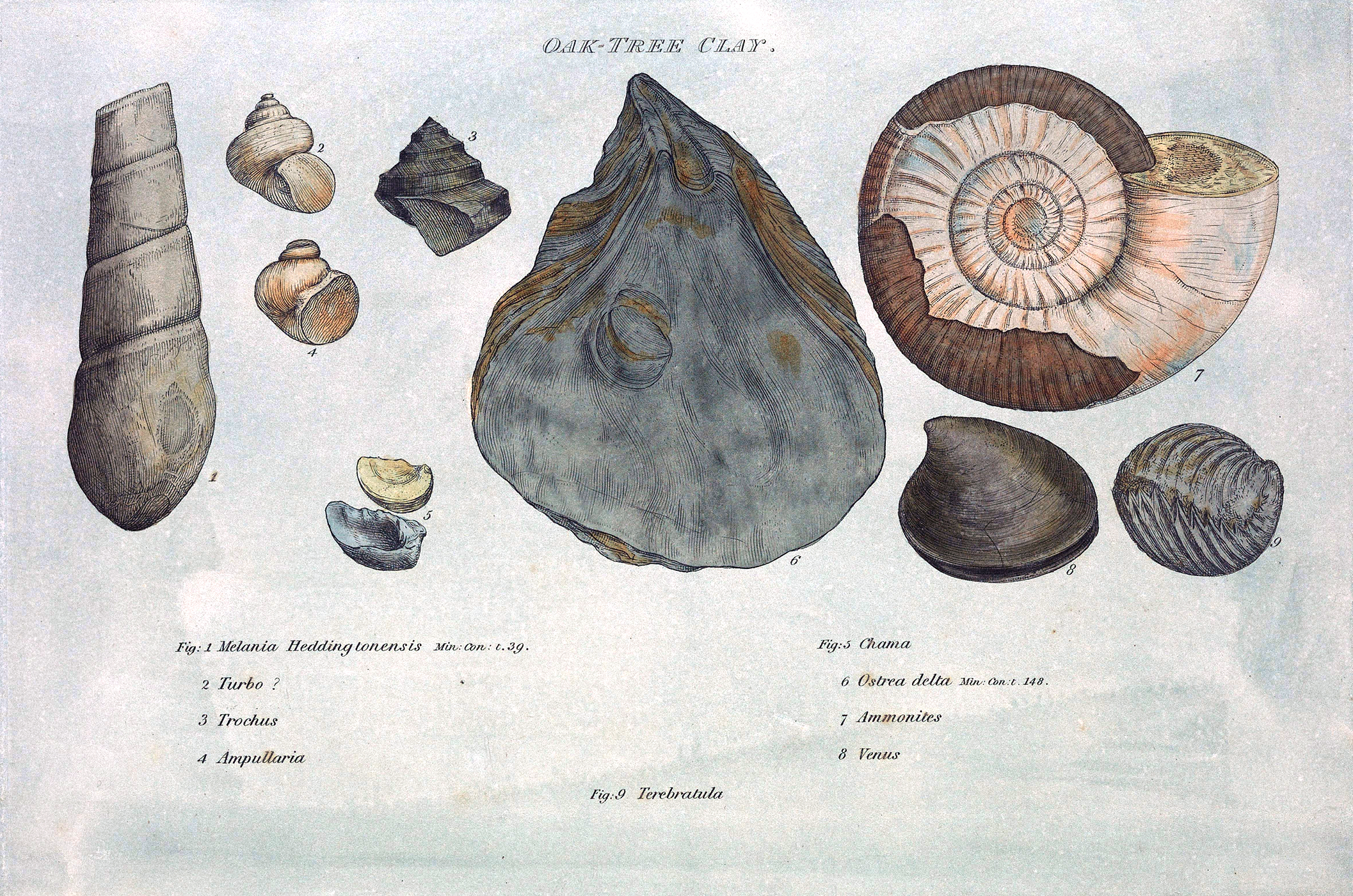
A plate from William Smith's 1815 work Strata by Organized Fossils

Soon thereafter, Buffon's colleague Chevalier de Lamarck – a founder of invertebrate systematics and invertebrate paleontology – published still-more shell fossils in his Systematics of Animals Without Backbones, (1801) and his Natural History of Animals Without Backbones (1815 to 1822), so as to illustrate global changes in paleogeography. Lamarck also argued that the more adaptable prehistoric invertebrates were the animals that survived environmental change – a prelude to the concept of survival of the fittest.

Next, William Smith employed invertebrate index fossils to map British outcrops in his Geological Map of England and Wales with Part of Scotland (1815), and in his book the very next year, Strata Identified by Organized Fossils (1816).

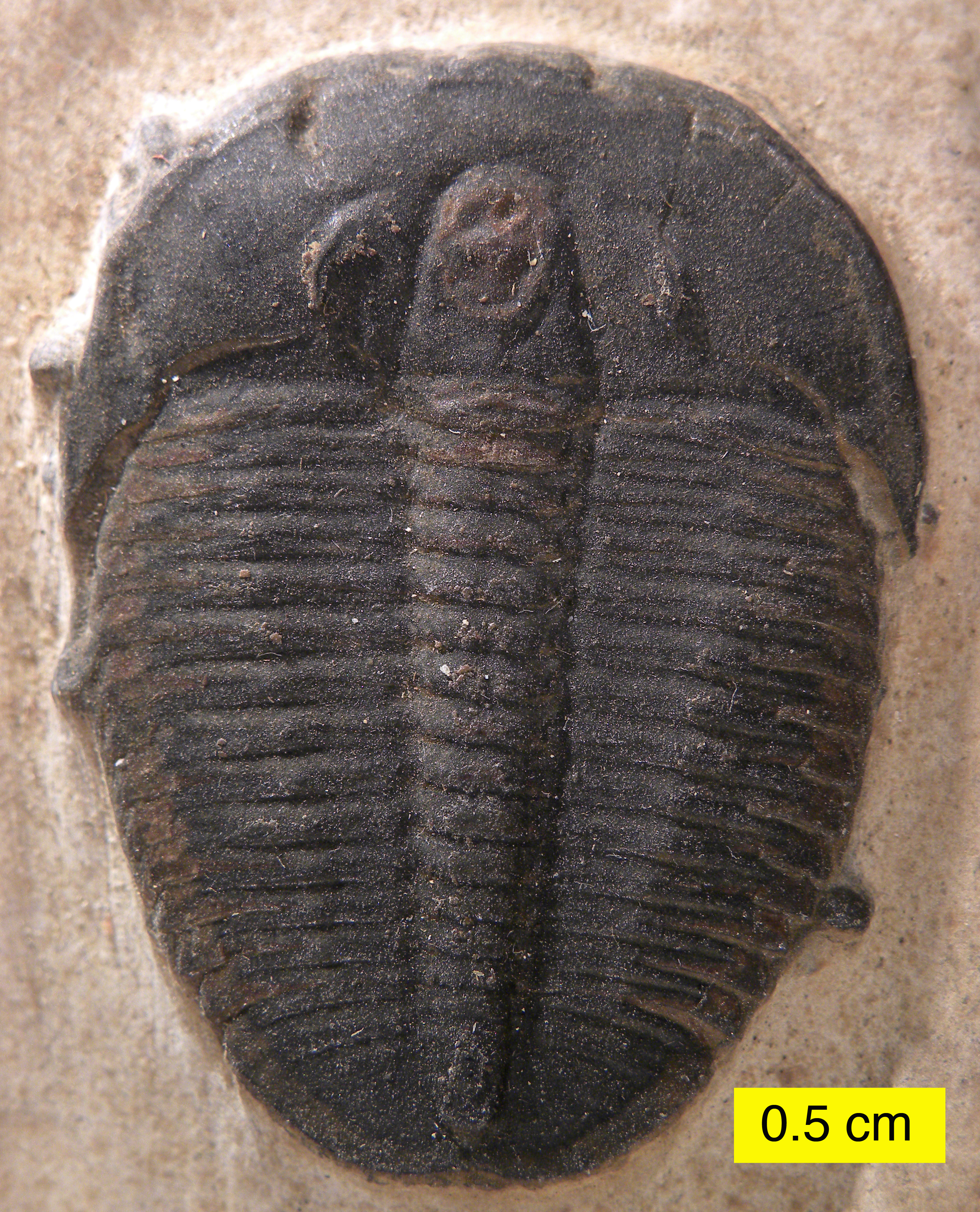
Trilobite fossil

Sir Roderick Impey Murchison and Charles Lapworth quarried middle Paleozoic era index fossils, such as the extinct trilobites, extinct graptolites, and mostly extinct brachiopods. Their efforts led to the latter's ground-breaking treatise, The Silurian System (1839), and to the naming of the Ordovician, Silurian, Devonian and Permian geologic periods. Eclipsing Maurchison's inventory of Silurian fossils, however, was Adam Sedgwick's 1835 discovery of even-older Cambrian period fossils. Three years later, Sedgwick proposed that its stratigraphic era be named the Paleozoic.

Meanwhile, yet another Briton, Sir Charles Lyell, penned his Principles of Geology (1830) and Elements of Geology (1838) in which he divided the Tertiary into the epochs of Eocene, Miocene, Oligocene and Pliocene. By 1834 to 1838, naturalists from France to Russia were using the term "paleontology", and adding yet other names to its prehistoric eons, eras, periods, epochs, and ages.

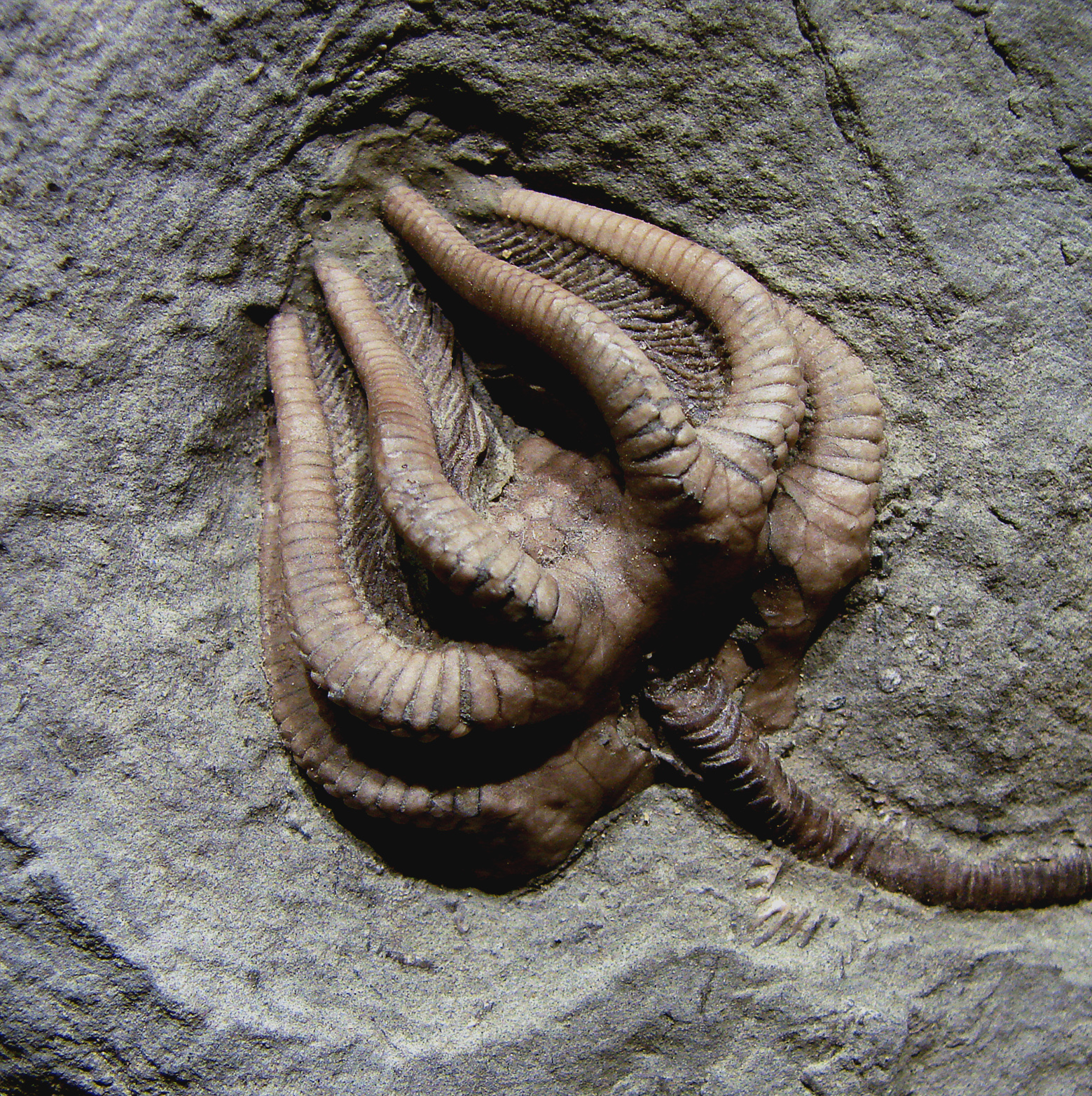
Crinoid fossil

The provocative Vestiges of the Natural History of Creation (1844 to 1853) by then-anonymous Robert Chambers, Alfred Russel Wallace's joint essay (1858) with Charles Darwin, and Darwin's Origin of Species (1859 to 1872) popularized the evolutionary theories of natural selection. Indeed, in the very first edition of his Origin of Species (1859), Darwin even speculated that the earth might be half a billion years old. Scientific critics, however, pressured him to withdraw this notion from all subsequent editions. In this book Darwin also expressed frustration at the seemingly total absence of Pre-Cambrian creatures prior to the Cambrian explosion of the invertebrates, since many critics saw this absence as proof of creationism.

Around the same time, James Hall produced his comprehensive, many volumes of Paleontology of New York State (1847 to 1894), based on his years of collecting trilobites, graptolites, brachiopods, crinoids, echinoids, mollusks and other ancient marine invertebrates.

Inspired by Darwin's manifesto, Thomas Henry Huxley emphatically cited embryologic and fossil evidence for the evolution of "higher" invertebrates from "lower" cnidarians, worms and mollusks, thereby elaborating what he concluded was Man's Place in Nature (1863). Another Darwinist, Ernst Haeckel, proposed a Protozoa-Metazoa theory of animal origins, while arguing that embryonic "ontogeny recapitulates phylogeny" throughout organic prehistory. Haeckel popularized his paleozoologic ideas with majestic genealogical trees of the Animal Kingdom in his General Morphology of Organisms (1866).

A half-century later, the genetic conclusions of Gregor Mendel (1822 to 1884) were revived by The Mutation Theory propounded by Hugo de Vries, thereby fortifying Darwin's 19th-century theory of evolution.

== 20th-century developments ==
Around the same time, paleozoologist Charles Doolittle Walcott proved trilobites to be arthropods – and not at all like mollusks. Then, in 1910, he discovered the best-preserved Cambrian fossils ever found: the Burgess Shale fauna. Over the next seven years, Walcott excavated 80,000 fossils from the fossiliferous site.

Meanwhile, in The Origin of Continents and Oceans (1915 / 1929), Alfred Wegener outlined his heretical theory of continental drift. Although he cited invertebrate fossils and continental geography in support of his idea, another half-century would pass before Wegener's theory would be vindicated by findings in geophysics and plate tectonics.

By that time, 20th-century sciences – such as biometrics, organic chemistry, electron microscopy and molecular phylogenetics – were aiding invertebrate paleobiologists as they searched for evidence even in the rugged, barren lands of Saharan Africa, Sinkiang, the Mongolian Plateau, and Antarctica.

In 1947, paleontologist Reg Sprigg discovered the Ediacaran fauna – the best-preserved fossil invertebrates of the billion-year-long Proterozoic eon. Darwin's 1859 embarrassment at the absence of Pre-Cambrian fossils was now put at rest.

== See also ==
- Evolutionary biology
- Fossil park
- History of biology
- History of evolutionary thought
- History of geology
- History of paleontology
- History of zoology (before Darwin)
- History of zoology (after Darwin)
- Invertebrate paleontology
- List of notable fossils
- List of fossil sites
- Taxonomy of commonly fossilised invertebrates
- Treatise on Invertebrate Paleontology
