= Paleobiology =

Study of organic evolution using fossils

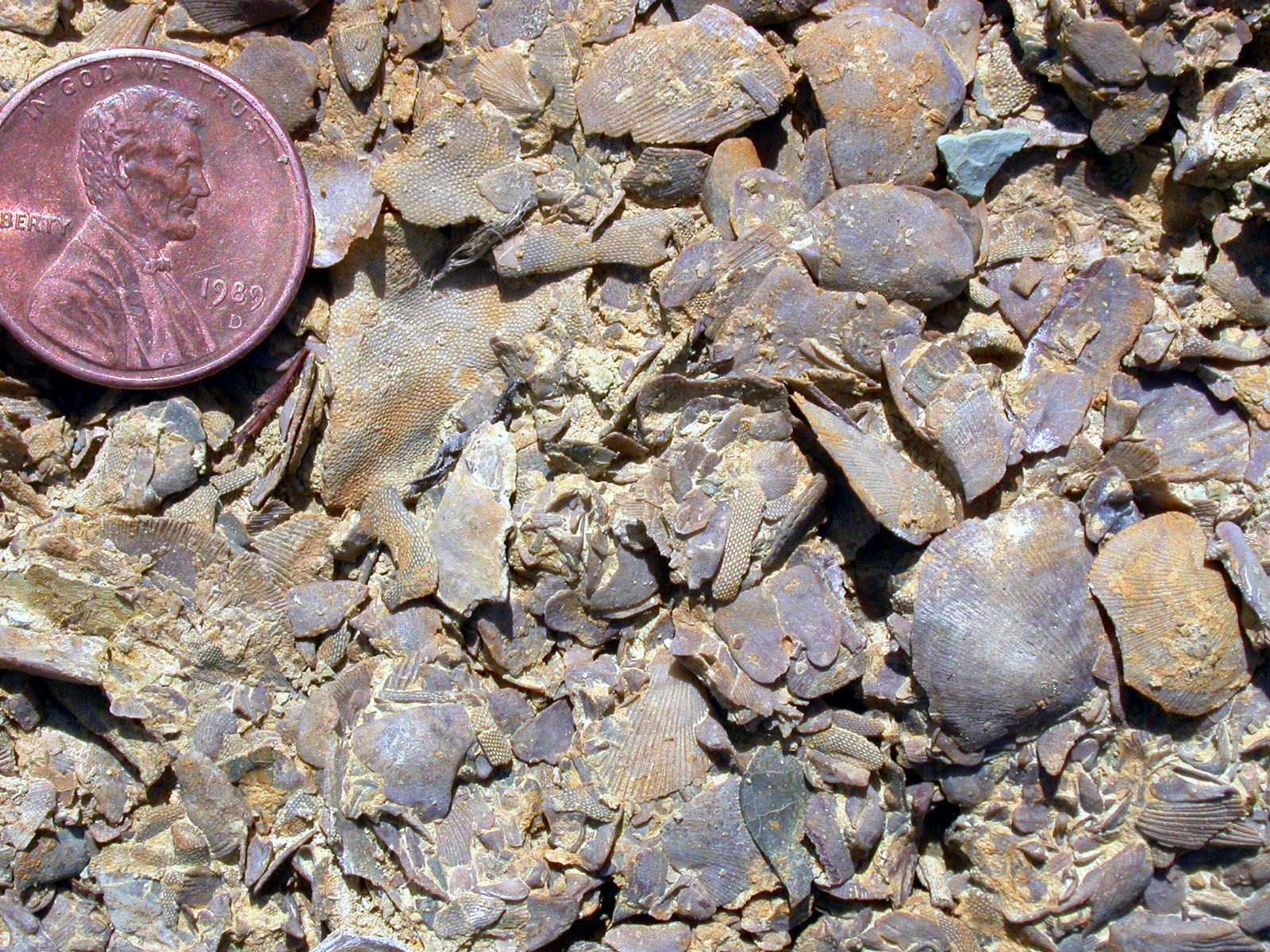
Brachiopods and bryozoans in an Ordovician limestone, southern Minnesota

Paleobiology (or palaeobiology) is an interdisciplinary field that combines the methods and findings found in both the earth sciences and the life sciences. An investigator in this field is known as a paleobiologist.

Paleobiology is closely related to the field of paleontology, although the latter focuses primarily on the study and taxonomic classification of fossil records, while paleobiology incorporates broader ecological, evolutionary and geological perspectives on the history of life on Earth. It is also not to be confused with geobiology, which focuses more on the contemporary interactions between the modern biosphere and the physical Earth.

Paleobiological research uses biological field research of current biota and of fossil evidence millions of years old to draw parallel and answer questions about the molecular evolution and the evolutionary history of life. In this scientific quest, macrofossils, microfossils and trace fossils are typically analyzed. However, the 21st-century biochemical analysis of DNA and RNA samples offers much promise, as does the biometric construction of phylogenetic trees.

== Important research areas ==
- Paleobotany applies the principles and methods of paleobiology to flora, especially green land plants, but also including the fungi and seaweeds (algae). See also paleomycology, paleophycology and dendrochronology.
- Paleozoology uses the methods and principles of paleobiology to understand fauna, both vertebrates and invertebrates. See also vertebrate and invertebrate paleontology, paleoichthyology, paleoentomology, paleornithology, as well as paleoanthropology.
- Micropaleontology applies paleobiologic principles and methods to archaea, bacteria, protists and microscopic pollen/spores. See also microfossils and palynology.
- Paleovirology examines the evolutionary history of viruses on paleobiological timescales.
- Paleobiochemistry uses the methods and principles of organic chemistry to detect and analyze molecular-level evidence of ancient life, both microscopic and macroscopic.
- Paleoecology examines past ecosystems, climates, and geographies so as to better comprehend prehistoric life.
- Taphonomy analyzes the post-mortem history (for example, decay and decomposition) of an individual organism in order to gain insight on the behavior, death and environment of the fossilized organism.
- Paleoichnology analyzes the tracks, borings, trails, burrows, impressions, and other trace fossils left by ancient organisms in order to gain insight into their behavior and ecology.
- Stratigraphic paleobiology studies long-term secular changes, as well as the (short-term) bed-by-bed sequence of changes, in organismal characteristics and behaviors. See also stratification, sedimentary rocks and the geologic time scale.
- Evolutionary developmental paleobiology examines the evolutionary aspects of the modes and trajectories of growth and development in the evolution of life – clades both extinct and extant. See also adaptive radiation, cladistics, evolutionary biology, developmental biology and phylogenetic tree.

== Paleobiologists ==
The founder or "father" of modern paleobiology was Austrian paleontologist and evolutionary biologist Othenio Abel.

However, credit for coining the word paleobiology itself goes to Professor Charles Schuchert. He proposed the term in 1904 so as to initiate "a broad new science" joining "traditional paleontology with the evidence and insights of geology and isotopic chemistry." In 1912, Abel coined the German term in his work Grundzüge der Paläobiologie der Wirbeltiere.

Charles Doolittle Walcott, a Smithsonian adventurer, has been cited as the "founder of Precambrian paleobiology". Although best known as the discoverer of the mid-Cambrian Burgess Shale animal fossils, in 1883 this American curator found the "first Precambrian fossil cells known to science" – a stromatolite reef then known as Cryptozoon algae. In 1899 he discovered the first acritarch fossil cells, a Precambrian algal phytoplankton he named Chuaria. Lastly, in 1914, Walcott reported "minute cells and chains of cell-like bodies" belonging to Precambrian purple bacteria.

Later 20th-century paleobiologists have also figured prominently in finding Archaean and Proterozoic eon microfossils: In 1954, Stanley A. Tyler and Elso S. Barghoorn described 2.1 billion-year-old cyanobacteria and fungi-like microflora at their Gunflint Chert fossil site. Eleven years later, Barghoorn and J. William Schopf reported finely-preserved Precambrian microflora at their Bitter Springs site of the Amadeus Basin, Central Australia.

In 1993, Schopf discovered O_{2}-producing blue-green bacteria at his 3.5 billion-year-old Apex Chert site in Pilbara Craton, Marble Bar, in the northwestern part of Western Australia. So paleobiologists were at last homing in on the origins of the Precambrian "Oxygen catastrophe".

During the early part of the 21st-century two paleobiologists, Anjali Goswami and Thomas Halliday, studied the evolution of mammaliaforms during the Mesozoic and Cenozoic eras (between 299 million to 12,000 years ago). Additionally, they uncovered and studied the morphological disparity and rapid evolutionary rates of living organisms near the end and in the aftermath of the Cretaceous mass extinction (145 million to 66 million years ago).

== Paleobiologic journals ==
- Acta Palaeontologica Polonica
- Biology and Geology
- Historical Biology
- PALAIOS
- Palaeogeography, Palaeoclimatology, Palaeoecology
- Paleobiology (journal)
- Paleoceanography

== Paleobiology in the general press ==
Books written for the general public on this topic include the following:

- The Rise and Reign of the Mammals: A New History, from the Shadow of the Dinosaurs to Us written by Steve Brusatte
- Otherlands: A Journey Through Earth's Extinct Worlds written by Thomas Halliday
- Introduction to Paleobiology and the Fossil Record – 22 April 2020 by Michael J. Benton (Author), David A. T. Harper (Author)

== See also ==
- History of biology
- History of paleontology
- History of invertebrate paleozoology
- Molecular paleontology
- Natural history
- Taxonomy of commonly fossilised invertebrates
- Treatise on Invertebrate Paleontology
