= Paleozoology =

Study of prehistoric animals

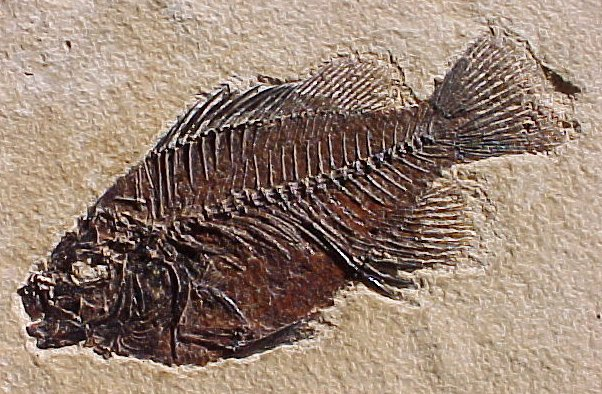
Priscacara liops, fish fossil from Wyoming

Palaeozoology or paleozoology (Greek: παλαιόν, palaeon ('old') and ζῷον, zoon ('animal')) is the branch of paleontology and evolutionary biology that specifically deals with the study of prehistoric organisms from the kingdom Animalia and the recovery and identification of their fossil remains from geological (or even archaeological) contexts. The field also extends to the use of these fossil records for reconstructive phylogeny (via comparative anatomy and phylogenetics) and paleoecology, i.e. the study of ancient natural environments and ecosystems.

While speculative fossils of earliest animals (in the form of primitive sponges such as Otavia) can trace back to the late Tonian period of the mid-Neoproterozoic era, definitive macroscopic metazoan remains are mainly found in the fossil record from the Ediacaran period onwards, although they do not become common until after the Cambrian Explosion, and vertebrate fossils do not become common until the Late Devonian period in the latter half of the Paleozoic era. Perhaps the best known macrofossils group is the dinosaurs. Other popularly known animal-derived macrofossils include trilobites, crustaceans, echinoderms, brachiopods, mollusks, bony fishes, sharks, Vertebrate teeth, and shells of numerous invertebrate groups. This is because hard organic parts, such as bones, teeth, and shells resist decay, and are the most commonly preserved and found animal fossils. Exclusively soft-bodied animals — such as jellyfish, flatworms, nematodes, and annelids — are consequently rarely fossilized, as these groups have few mineralized tissues that can survive geological processes, although trace fossils of their existence and activities can be preserved.

== Vertebrate paleozoology ==
Vertebrate paleozoology refers to the use of morphological, temporal, and stratigraphic data to map vertebrate history in evolutionary theory. Vertebrates are classified as a subphylum of Chordata, a phylum used to classify species adhering to a rod-shaped, flexible body type called a notochord. They differ from other phyla in that other phyla may have cartilage or cartilage-like tissues forming a sort of skeleton, but only vertebrates possess what we define as bone.

Classes of vertebrates listed in chronological order from oldest to most recent include heterostracans, osteostracans, coelolepid agnathans, acanthodians, osteichthyan fishes, chondrichthyan fishes, amphibians, reptiles, mammals, and birds. All vertebrates are studied under standard evolutionary generalizations of behavior and life process, although there is controversy over whether population can be accurately estimated from limited fossil resources.

Evolutionary origins of vertebrates as well as the phylum Chordata have not been scientifically determined. Many believe vertebrates diverged from a common ancestor of chordates and echinoderms. This belief is well supported by the prehistoric marine creature Amphioxus. Amphioxus does not possess bone, making it an invertebrate, but it has common features with vertebrates including a segmented body and a notochord. This could imply that Amphioxus is a transitional form between an early chordate, echinoderm or common ancestor, and vertebrates.

== Quantitative paleozoology ==
Quantitative paleozoology is a process of taking a census of fossil types rather than inventory. They differ in that inventory refers to a detailed log of individual fossils, whereas census attempts to group individual fossils to tally the total number of a species. This information can be used to determine which species were most dominant and which had the largest population at a time period or in a geological region.

In the early 1930s, paleontologists Chester Stock and Hildegarde Howard devised special units for quantitative paleozoology and quantitative paleontology. The first unit used, Number of Identified Species (NISP), specified exact quantity of fossils from a specific species recorded. Stock and Howard determined this unit to be problematic for quantitative purposes as an excess of a small fossil—such as teeth—could exaggerate quantity of the species. There was also an amount of confusion as to whether bone fragments should be assembled and counted as one bone or tallied individually. Stock and Howard then devised the Minimum Number of Individuals (MNI), which estimated the minimum number of animals needed to produce the fossils recorded. For example, if five scapulae from a species were found, it might be difficult to determine whether some of them were paired right and left on one individual or whether each came from a different individual, which could alter census, but it could be said that there must be at least three individuals to produce five scapulae. Three would thus be the MNI. In rare cases where enough of a collection of fossils can be assembled into individuals as to provide an accurate number of individuals, the unit used is Actual Number of Individuals, or ANI.

Another unit commonly used in quantitative paleozoology is biomass. Biomass is defined as the amount of tissue in an area or from a species. It is calculated by estimating an average weight based on similar modern species and multiplying it by the MNI. This yields an estimate of how much the entire population of a species may have weighed. Problems with this measurement include the difference in weight between youngsters and adults, seasonal weight changes due to diet and hibernation, and the difficulty of accurately estimating the weight of a creature with only a skeletal reference. It is also difficult to determine exact age of fossilized matter within a year or a decade, a biomass estimate might be grossly overstated or understated if the estimated time frame in which the fossils were alive is incorrect.

A similar measurement to biomass is meat weight. To determine meat weight, MNI is multiplied by the amount of meat an individual is thought to have provided, then multiplied by the percentage of that meat thought to be edible. This gives an estimate of "pounds of usable meat" per individual which might have been harvested by prehistoric hunters. For example, a male Wapiti has an average weight of 400 kg, and in a particular study, the MNI of Wapiti was found to be 10. This would create a biomass of 4,000 kg. If the amount of edible meat is estimated at 50 percent, this would result in a meat weight of 2,000 kg. The biggest problem with this method is the debate over "percent of usable meat." Different views on which parts of a species are edible and which are not as well as whether or not primitive butchers would have been able to access and prepare different parts have led to controversy.

== Conservation biology ==
Paleozoological data is used in research concerning conservation biology. Conservation biology refers to biological study used for conservation, control, and preservation of various species and ecosystems. In this context, the paleozoological data used is obtained from recently deceased decomposing matter rather than prehistoric matter.

R. Lee Lyman, Professor and Chair Department of Anthropology at the University of Missouri, writes that paleozoological research can provide data such as extinction rates and causes and "benchmark" peaks and drops in population which can be used to predict future patterns and to design maximally effective methods of controlling these patterns. In addition, paleozoological data can be used to compare current to former population and distribution of a species.

== See also ==
- Animalia, taxonomic kingdom of
- Fossils
- History of invertebrate paleozoology
- Index fossils—a.k.a. guide fossils
- Invertebrates
- Invertebrate paleontology covers most animal phyla
- Macrofossils—easily visible fossil evidence
- Metazoa—animal kingdom
- Microfossils—microscopic fossil evidence
- Micropaleontology
- Natural history
- Paleobiology—biology and paleontology
- Paleobotany
- Taxonomy of commonly fossilised invertebrates
- Trace fossils—indirect evidence of prehistoric life
- Vertebrates
- Vertebrate paleontology covers the subphylum Vertebrata
- Zooarchaeology
- Zoology
