= Taxonomy of commonly fossilised invertebrates =

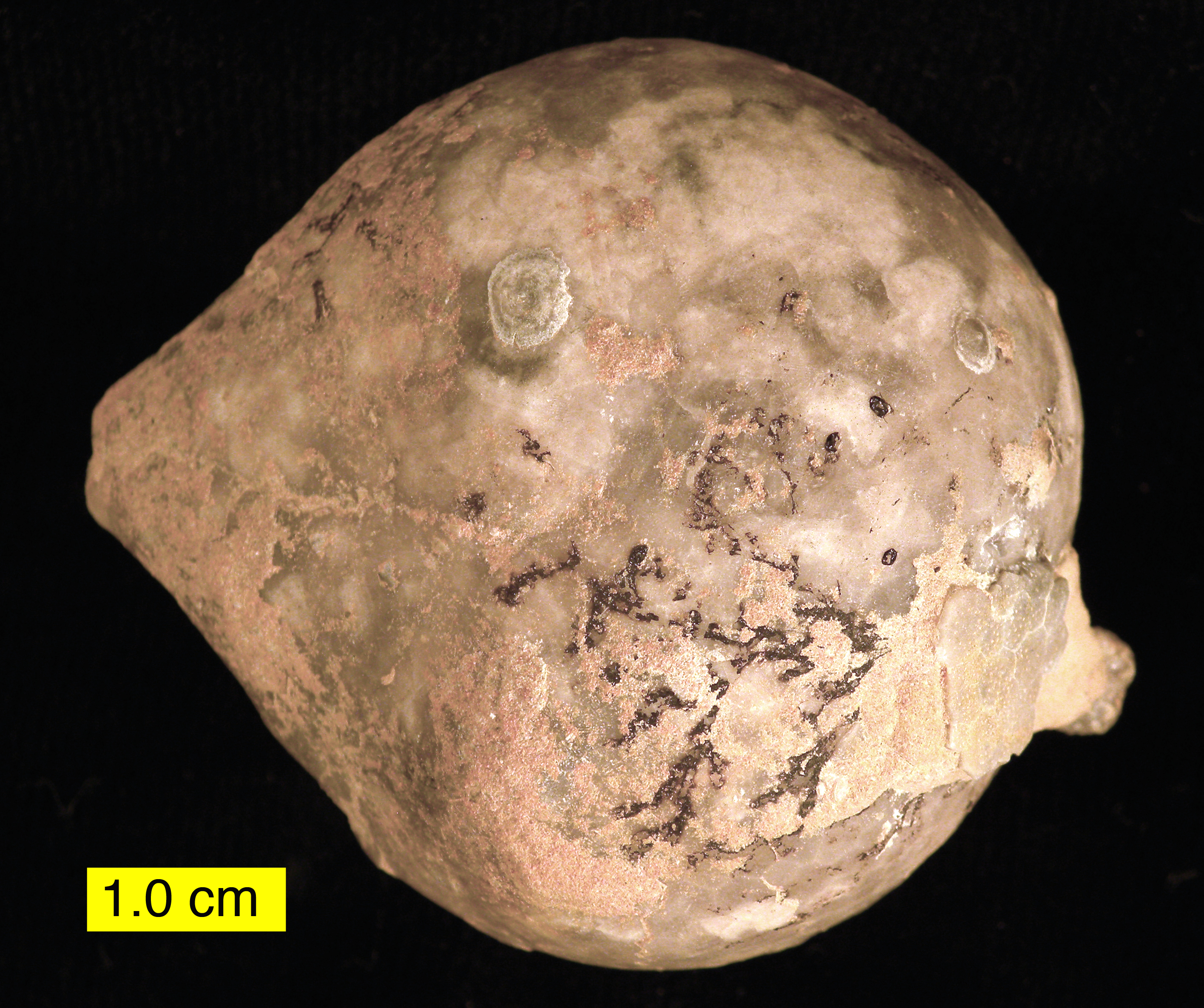
The Ordovician cystoid Echinosphaerites (an extinct echinoderm of the Class Rhombifera) from northeastern Estonia; encrusted by a graptolite (black branches).

The taxonomy of commonly fossilized invertebrates combines both traditional and modern paleozoological terminology. This article compiles various invertebrate taxa in the fossil record, ranging from protists to arthropods. This includes groups that are significant in paleontological contexts, abundant in the fossil record, or have a high proportion of extinct species. Special notations are explained below:

- [ ! ]: Indicates clades that are important as fossils or abundant in the fossil record.
- [ – ]: Indicates clades that contain a large proportion of extinct species.
- [ † ]: Indicates completely extinct clades.

The paleobiologic systematics that follow are not intended to be comprehensive, rather, they are designed to encompass invertebrates that (a) are popularly collected as fossils and (b) extinct. As a result, some groups of invertebrates are not listed.

If an invertebrate animal is mentioned below using its common (vernacular) name, it is an extant (living) taxon, but if it is cited by its scientific genus, then it is typically an extinct invertebrate known only from the fossil record.

Invertebrate clades that are important fossils (e.g. ostracods, frequently used as index fossils), and clades that are very abundant as fossils (e.g. crinoids, easily found in crinoidal limestone), are highlighted with a bracketed exclamation mark [ ! ].

== Domain of Eukaryota/Eukarya ==
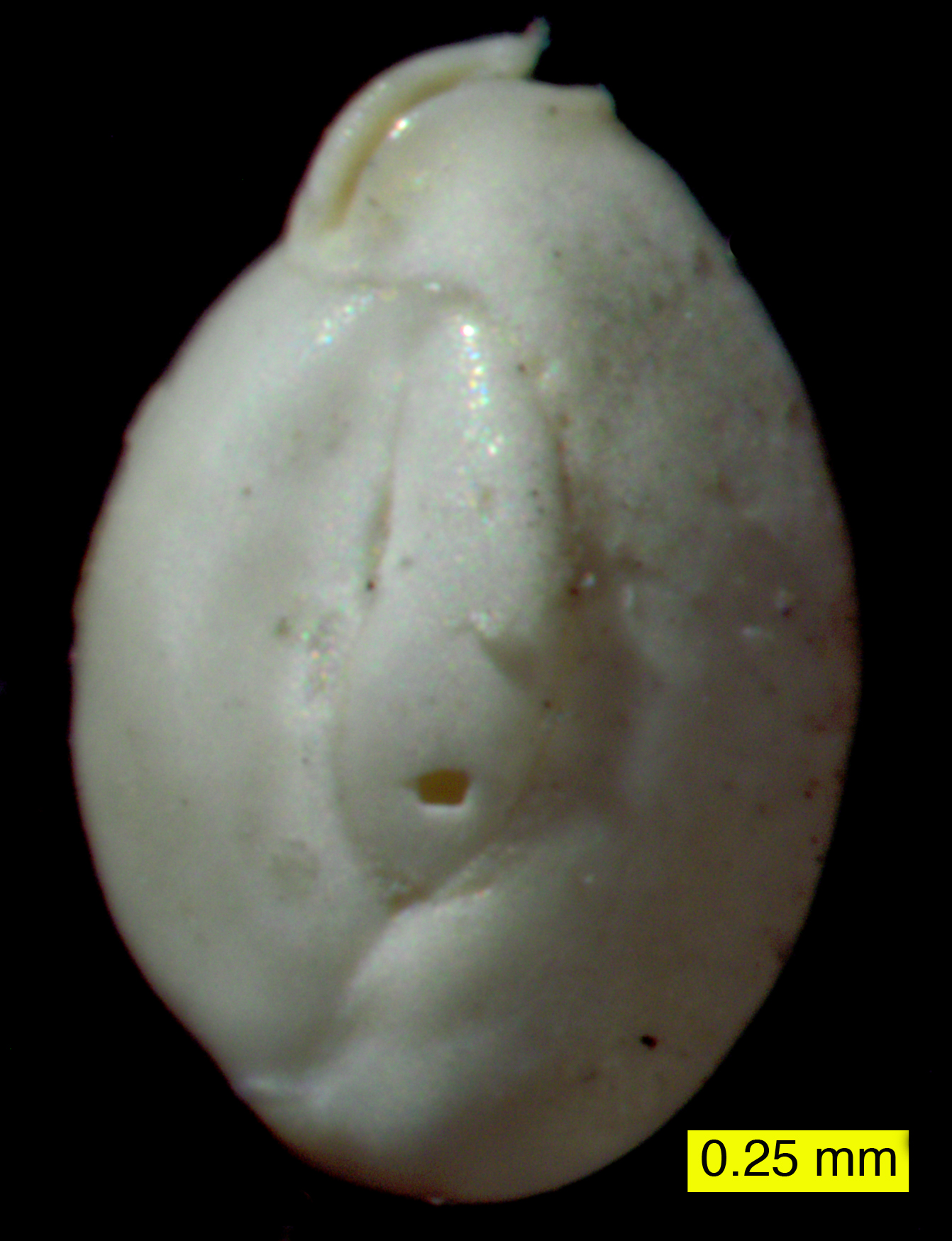
Quinqueloculina, a foraminiferan (a type of protist) from Donegal Bay, Ireland.

Eukaryotes are cellular organisms bearing a central, organized nucleus with DNA.

- most species documented by biologists and palaeontologists, extinct or extant, are eukaryotic.
- includes: a wide variety of single-celled protists; all algae; most plankton; most molds; green plants; and all animal-related kingdoms.
  - does not include the primal, sub-nuclear, prokaryotic domains of Archaea and Bacteria – nor the enigmatic domain of Viruses.

=== Sub-domain of Opisthokonta ===
Opisthokonts; the animal-related kingdoms. These include proto-spongal choanoflagellates; proto-fungal microsporidians; and true fungi; true animals.

- most life forms documented, extinct or extant.
  - excludes: many molds; all one-celled protists (protoctists); all algae; all green plants.

== Kingdom of Animalia / Metazoa - All Invertebrates and Vertebrates ==
Metazoans are multicellular "true" animals (multicellular creatures that capture and ingest their organic food).

- comprises most living and deceased species which have ever been recorded, extinct or extant.
  - excludes all unicellular and fungal opisthokonts.

== Sub-kingdom of Parazoa ==
Parazoans are typically sessile, basal non-eumetazoans. They are the most primitive animals, comprising simple, colonial, attached, bottom-dwelling marine invertebrates.

=== Phylum Archaeocyatha/Archeocyatha/Archaeocyathida/Archeocyathida/Pleospongia [†] ===
Cone-shaped archaeocyathids/archeocyathids; cup-shaped archaeocyathans/archeocyathans; reef-building pleosponges; calcareous "ancient-cups".

Includes fossil genera such as Archaeocyathus, Cambrocyathus, Atikonia, Tumuliolynthus, Kotuyicyathus, Metaldetes, Ajacicyathus and Paranacyathus.

Archaeocyatha is sometimes classified as a class of Porifera below.

=== Phylum Porifera/Nuda/Spongia ===
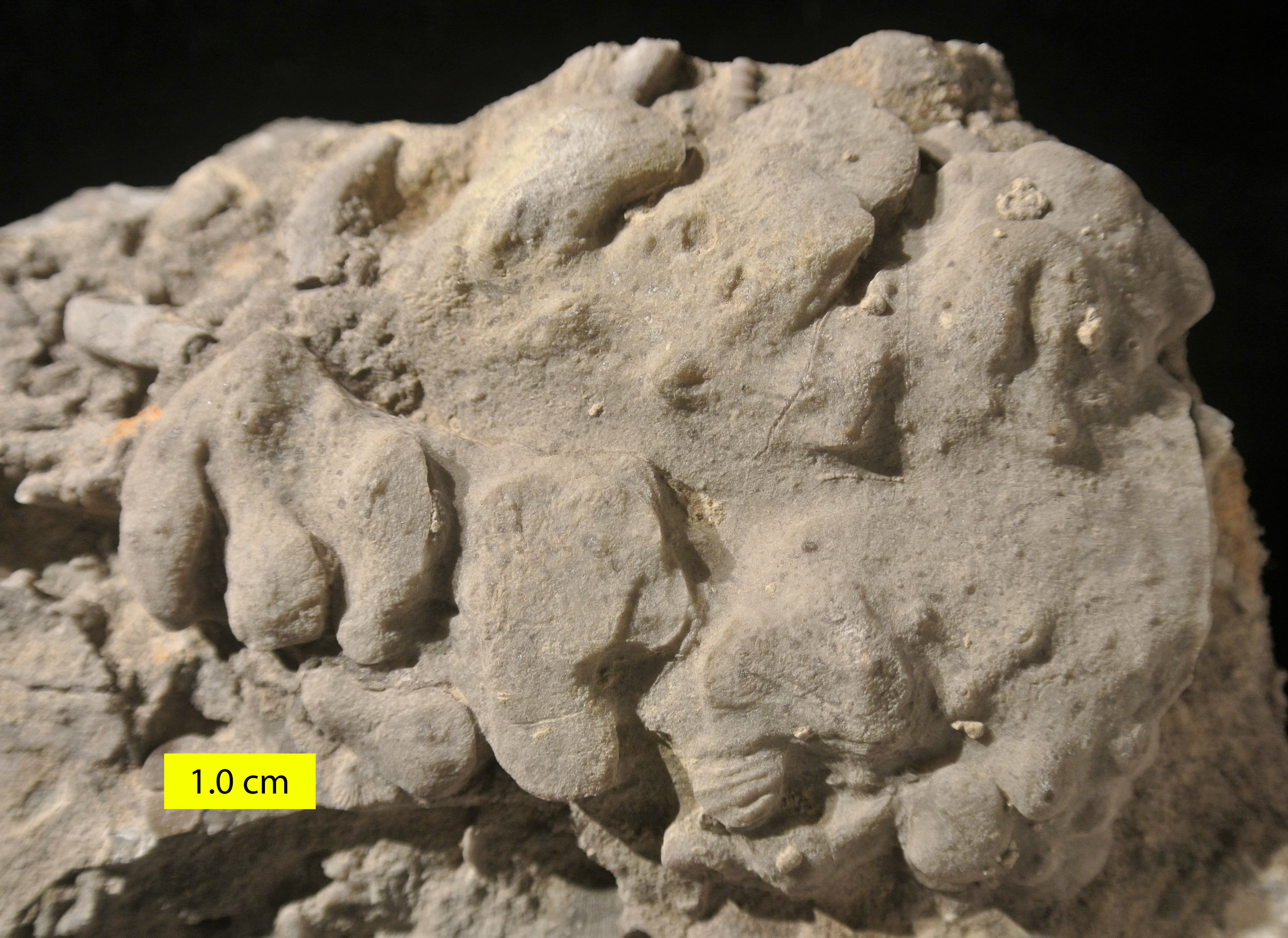
Pattersonia ulrichi Rauff, 1894; an Ordovician hexactinellid sponge near Cincinnati, Ohio.

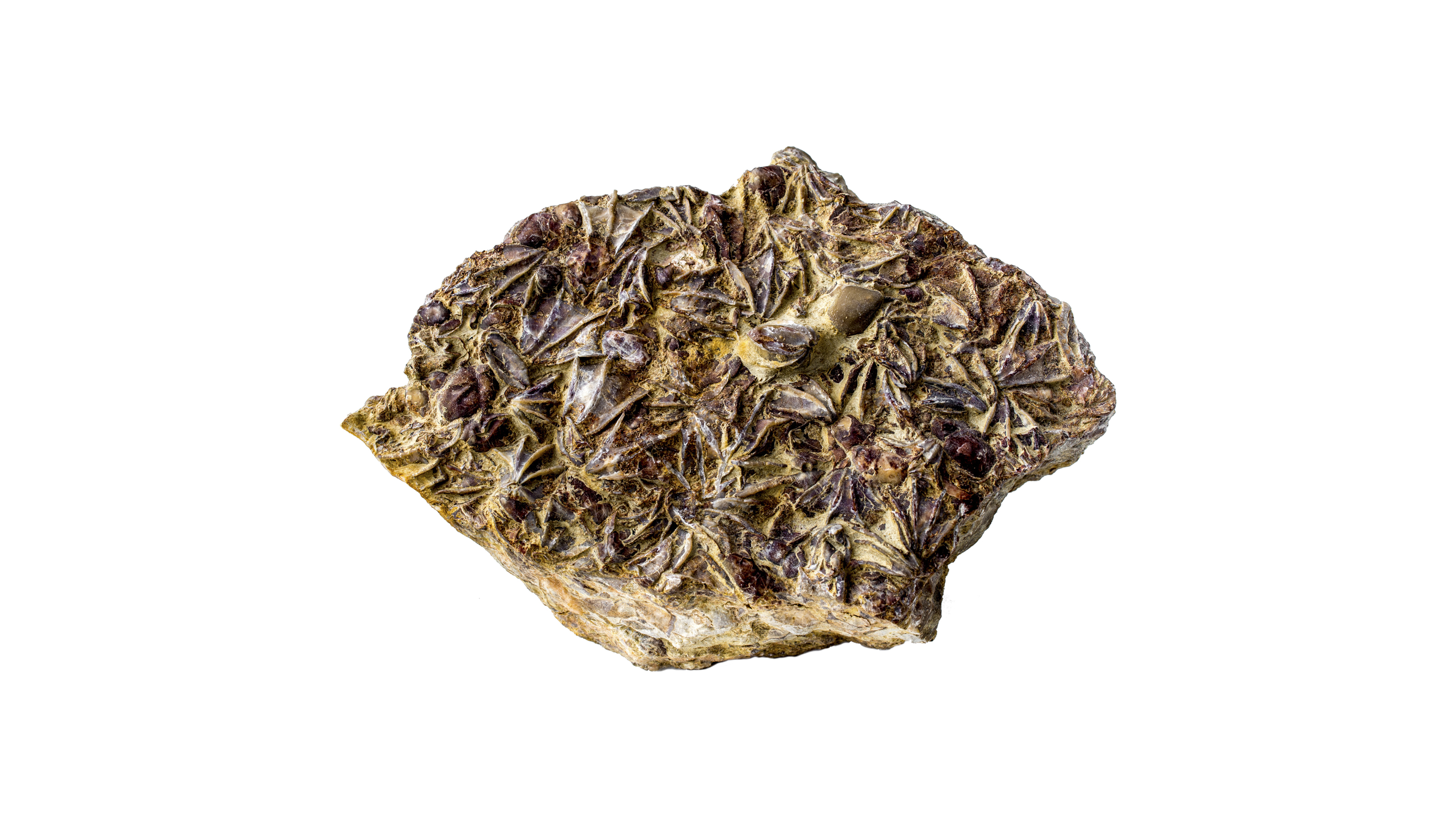
Tetractinella trigonella at MUSE - Science Museum in Trento

Quintessential true sponges; marine, colonial, pore-bearing animals; organized collar-flagellates; poriferans - today mostly siliceous – half of all documented species of Porifera are fossils and extinct.

Porifera may eventually be broken up into separate phyla:

- Sub-phylum Calcarea/Calcispongiae (primitive calcareous poriferans such as yellow lemon sponge, sphinctozoans, pharetronids, Sycon, Leucetta, Gravestockia, Grantia, Astraeospongium, Clathrina, Lelapia, Rhaphidonema, and Girtyocoelia).
  - Class Calcinea
  - Class Calcaronea
  - Class Stromatoporoidea/Stromatoporata/Stromatoporida/Spongliomorphida [†] (lime-layered stromatoporoids/reef-building stromatoporates/button-shaped stromatoporid/disc-shaped spongliomorphids; e.g., Stromatopora, Aulacera, Stromatactis, Actinostroma, Discophyllum, Parallelopora and Amphipora)
  - Class Heteractinida [†] (Paleozoic calcitic heteractinids such as Eiffelia)
- Sub-phylum Silicea / Silicospongia (siliceous poriferans):
  - Class Demospongea/Demospongiae (most living sponges hardened by opaline silica or spongin; for instance, horny sponge, bath sponge, stove-pipe sponge, yellow boring sponge, carnivorous sponge, bristle sponge, chaetids, lithistids, Astroclera, Trypanites, Hindia, Ventriculites, Laosoiadia, Clionolithes, Tetractinella, and Astylospongia)
  - Class Hexactinellida/Hyalospongiae/Sclerospongiae (siliceous, deep-sea glass sponges, e.g. glassy-latticed Venus flower basket, bird's nest sponge, cloud sponge, Hexactinella, Hydroceras, Dictyonina, Brachiospongia, Titusvillea, and Rhizopoterion)

== Sub-kingdom of Eumetazoa ==
Eumetazoans; true metazoans (typically mobile, multicellular animals).

Eumetazoa contains most of the living and deceased species of recorded life, including most invertebrates (extinct and extant), as well as all vertebrate animals.

=== Super-phylum of Radiata ===
Radiates; non-bilaterian eumetazoans.

==== Phylum Cnidaria/Coelenterata ====
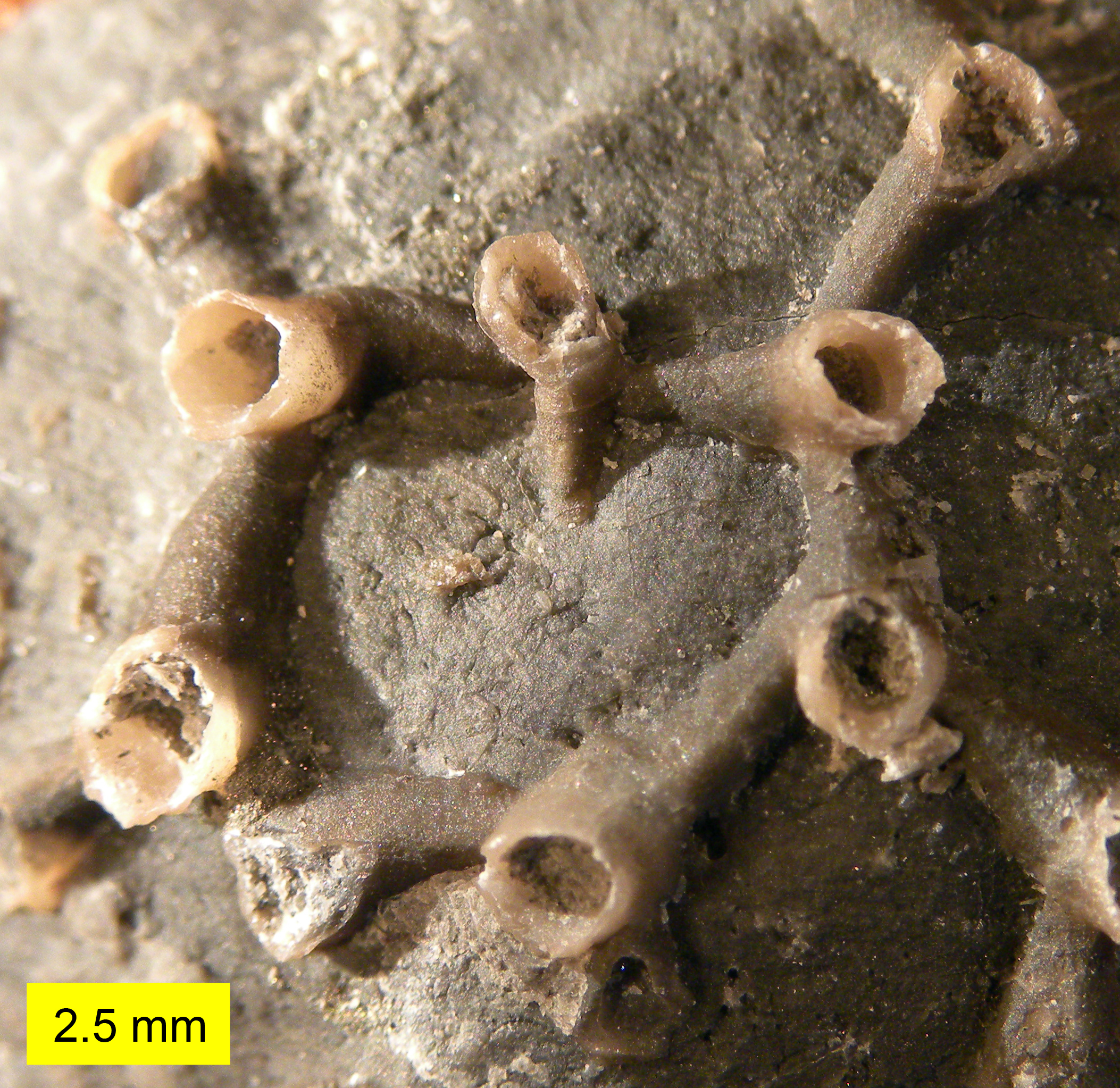
Aulopora (a tabulate coral) from the Silica Shale (Middle Devonian), northwestern Ohio.

Cnidarians/coelenterates:

- Class Hydrozoa (hydra or hydroid group):
  - Subclass Stromatoporoidea [†] (lime-layered stromatoporoids)
  - Subclass Conulata [†] (four-sided, pyramidal conularians)
- Class Anthozoa (corals/polyps):
  - Subclass Octocorallia / Alcyonacea (soft corals and sea pens)
  - Subclass Zoantharia [!] (sea anemones and most extant corals)
    - Order Rugosa / Tetracoralla [†] [!] (wrinkled, horn-shaped tetracorals such as Petoskey coral, Caninia and Heliophyllum)
    - Order Tabulata / Schizocoralla [†] [!] (tabulate corals, for instance, Favosites and Aulopora)
    - Order Scleractinia / Hexacoralla [!] (stony corals such as brain coral, Favia, Meandrina, and most living corals)

=== Super-phylum of Lophotrochozoa / Protostomia # 1 ===
Lophotrochozoan bilaterians, such as flatworms, ribbon worms, lophophorates, and molluscs.

==== Phylum Bryozoa/Ectoprocta/Polyzoa ====
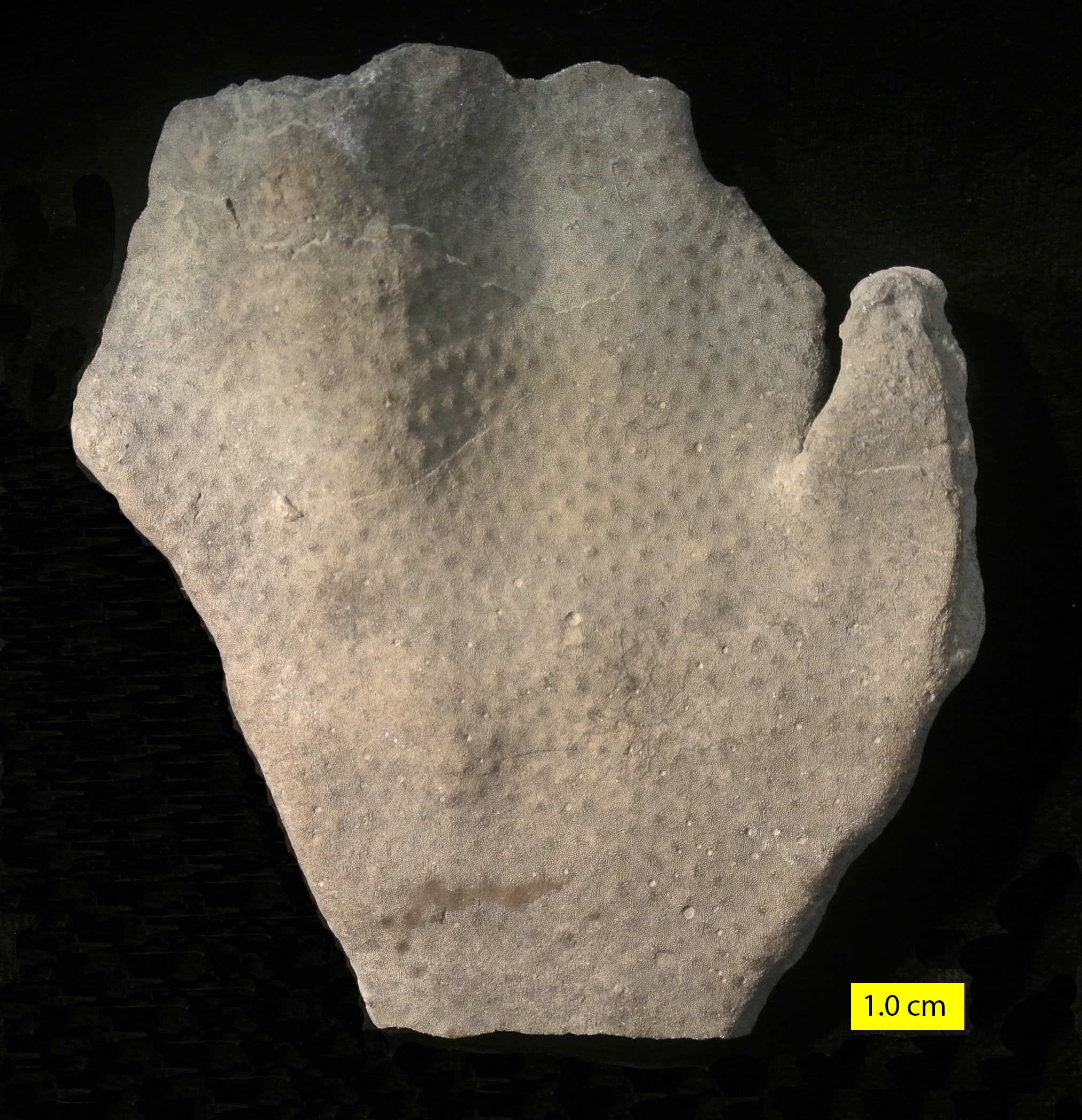
Heterotrypa, a trepostome bryozoan from the Corryville Formation (Upper Ordovician) in Covington, Kentucky.

Bryozoans – half of all documented species of Bryozoa are fossils and extinct.

- Class Stenolaemata / Gymnolaemata [!] (mostly marine, calcareous bryozoans):
  - Order Cheilostomata [!] (living, rimmed-mouthed moss animals)
  - Order Cyclostomatida (uncontracted, round-mouthed bryozoans including fossil Stomatopora)
  - Order Cystoporata [†] (extinct, minor group of moss animals)
  - Order Trepostomata [†] [!] (changed-mouthed bryozoans such as extinct Constellaria and Monticulipora)
  - Order Cryptostomata [†] [!] (round hidden-mouthed bryozoans such as Archimedes, Fenestrellina and Rhombopora)
  - Order Ctenostomata [†] (uncommon, comb-mouthed bryozoans)
  - Order Phylactolaemata (living, fresh-water bryozoans)

==== Phylum Brachiopoda ====
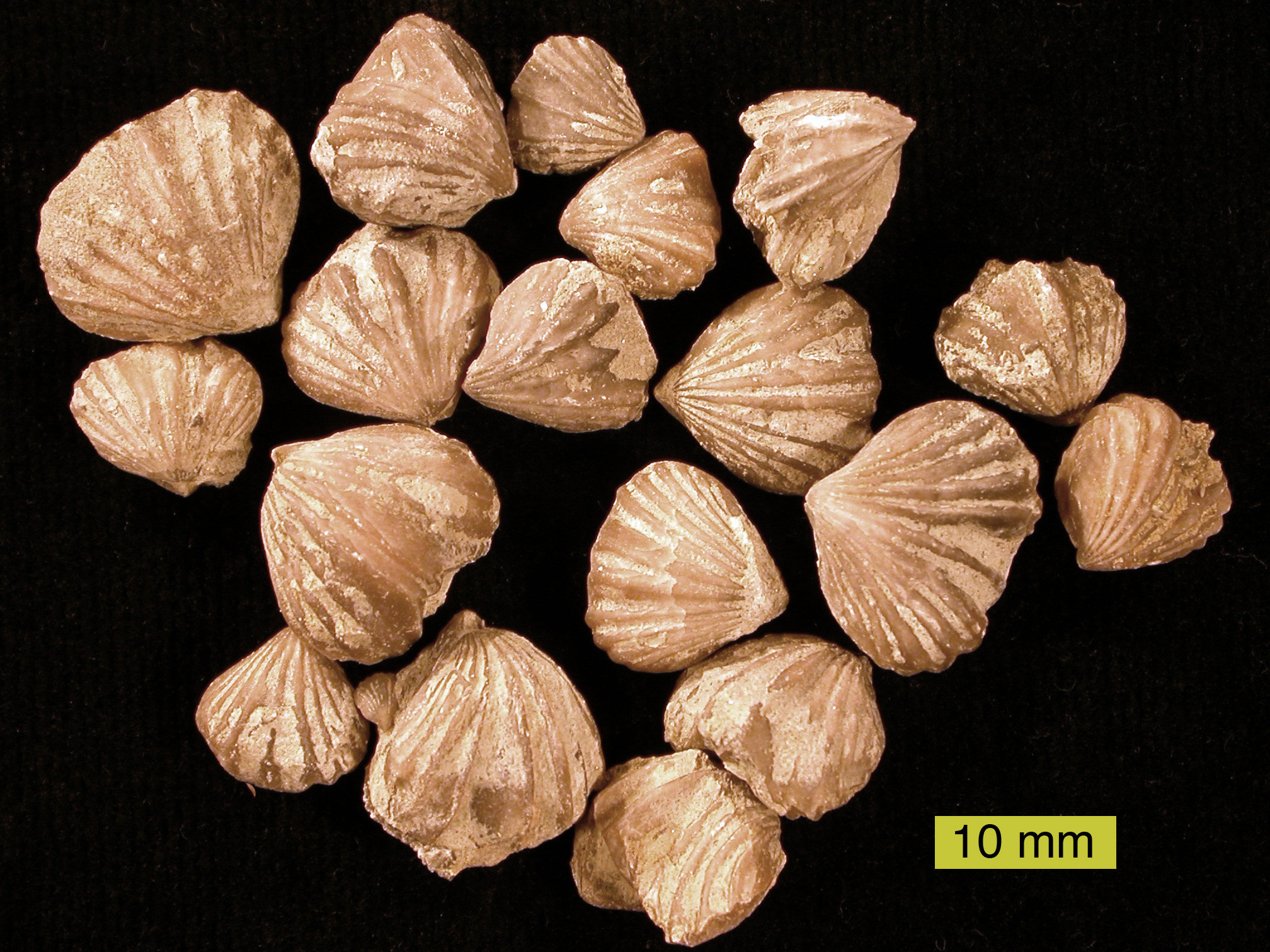
Rhynchotrema dentatum, a rhynchonellid brachiopod from the Cincinnatian (Upper Ordovician) of southeastern Indiana.

Lampshells, brachiopods or "brachs," (not to be confused with the hard-shelled marine mollusks below) – 99% of all documented species of Brachiopoda are now extinct.

- Subphylum Linguliformea (inarticulate atremates, such as "living fossil" Lingula) – but mostly extinct.
- Subphylum Craniiformea (inarticulate neotremates, such as extant Crania) – but mostly extinct.
- Subphylum Rhynchonelliformea [!] (articulate brachiopods with hinged valves; includes most extinct and living brachs).
  - Class Rhynchonellata [!]
    - Order Orthida [†] [!] (orthid brachs such as fossil Orthis)
    - Order Pentamerida [†] (pentamerid brachs such as Conchidium)
    - Order Rhynchonellida [!] (rhynchonellid brachs such as fossils Rhynchotrema and Rhynchonella)
    - Order Spiriferida [†] [!] (spiriferid brachs)
      - Suborder Spiriferinida [†] [!] (spiriferid brachs such as Spirifer and Eospirifer)
      - Suborder Atrypida [†] [!] (atrypid brachs such as Atrypa)
    - Order Terebratulida [!] (most living brachiopods; includes fossil Dielasma)
  - Class Strophomenata [†] [!] (so-called petrified butterflies)
    - Order Strophomenida [†] [!] (strophomenid brachs)
    - Order Productida [†] [!] (spiny or productid brachs)
      - Suborder Chonetidina [†] [!]
      - Suborder Productidina [†] [!]

==== Phylum Annelida ====
Segmented worms such as earthworms and leeches.

- Class Polychaeta (marine annelids / polychaetes)
  - Order Scolecodonta [!] (mostly chitinous jaws of scolecodonts)

==== Phylum Mollusca ====
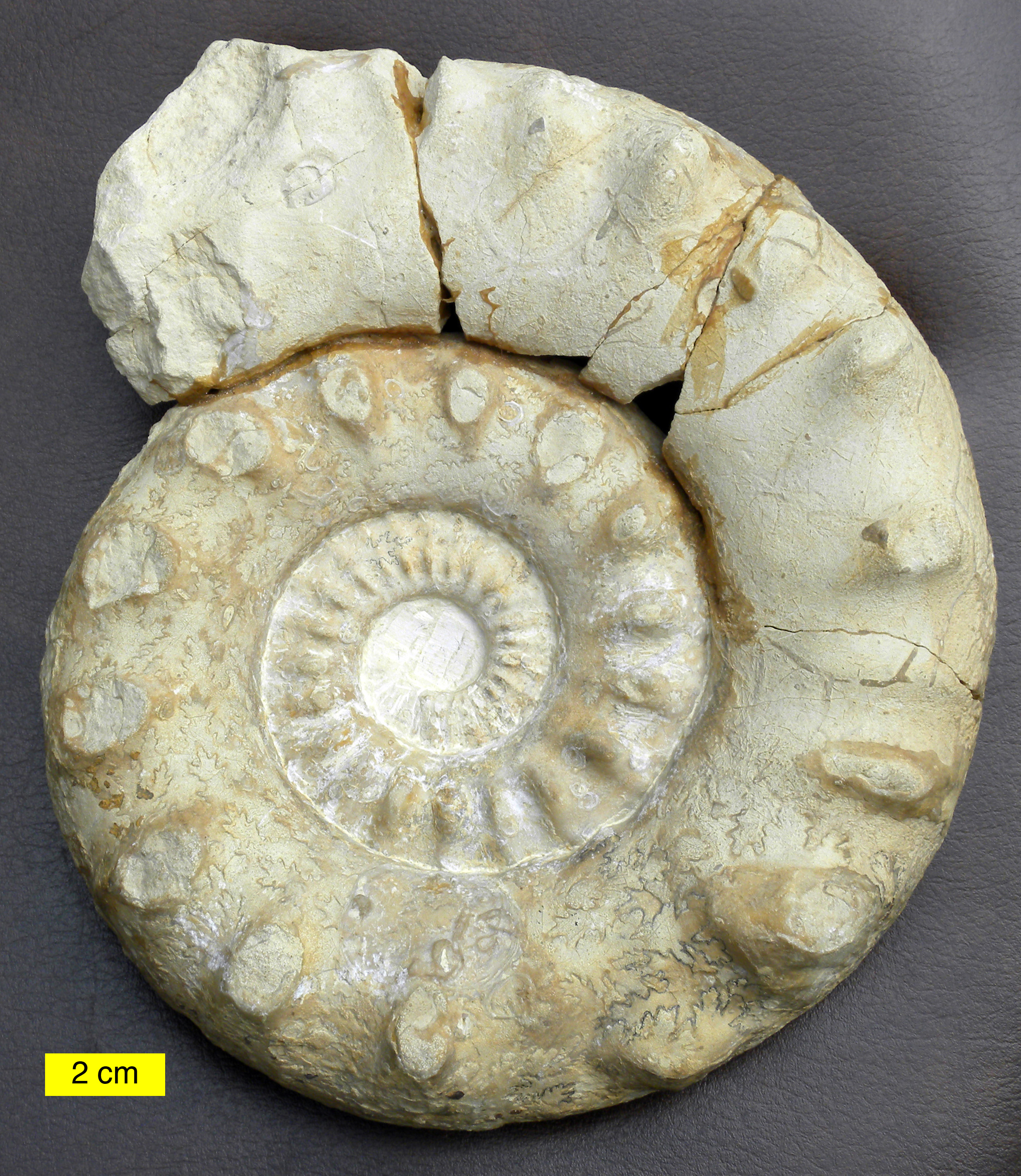
Peltoceras solidum ammonite from the Matmor Formation (Jurassic, Callovian) in the Matmor Formation, Makhtesh Gadol, Israel.

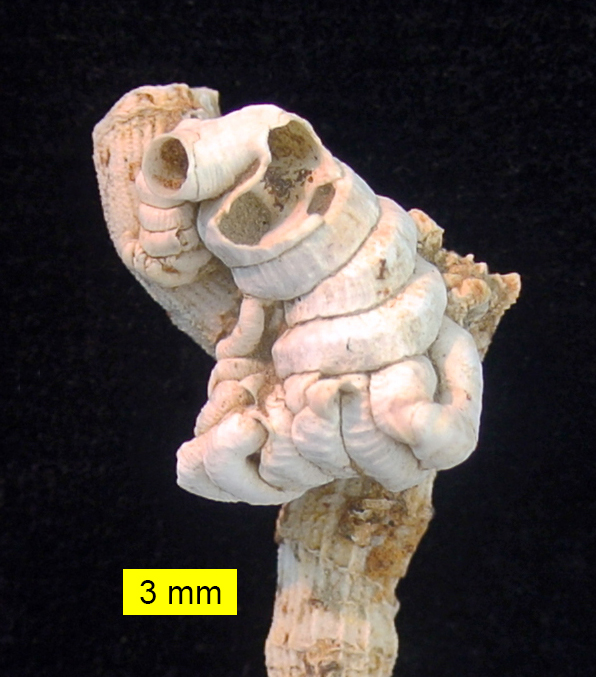
Vermetid gastropod Petaloconchus intortus attached to a branch of the coral Cladocora; Pliocene of Cyprus.

Molluscs or mollusks, not to be confused with the hard-shelled marine brachiopods above.

- Class Monoplacophora (extinct, except for "living fossil" Neopilina)
- Class Bivalvia / Pelecypoda (bivalves/pelecypods) – half of all documented species of Bivalvia are fossils and extinct
- Class Gastropoda (gastropods/snail group)
  - Subclass Prosobranchia (marine snails and conches)
  - Subclass Opisthobranchia (sea slugs)
  - Subclass Pulmonata (land snails)
- Class Cephalopoda (cephalopods) – 97 % of all documented species of Cephalopoda are now extinct
  - Subclass Nautiloidea (mostly extinct, but includes "living fossil" Nautilus)
    - Order Orthocerida [†] [!] (long, straight-shelled nautiloids)
  - Subclass Ammonoidea [†] [!] (generally coiled-shelled ammonoids)
    - Agoniatitic (Agoniatitida) [†]
    - Goniatitic (goniatites) [†] [!] (ammonoids with simple sutures)
    - Ceratitic (Ceratitida) [†]
    - Ammonitic [†] [!] (the true ammonites, bearing complex sutures)
  - Subclass Coleoidea (includes the living squid, cuttlefish, and octopus)
    - Order Belemnoidea [†] (extinct orthoconic belemnoids)

=== Super-phylum of Ecdysozoa/Protostomia # 2 ===
Ecdysozoans, such as nematodes, horsehair worms, and molting bilaterians/panarthropods

==== Phylum Tardigrada ====
Panarthropodic water bears.

==== Phylum Onychophora ====
Panarthropodic velvet worms,

==== Phylum Arthropoda ====
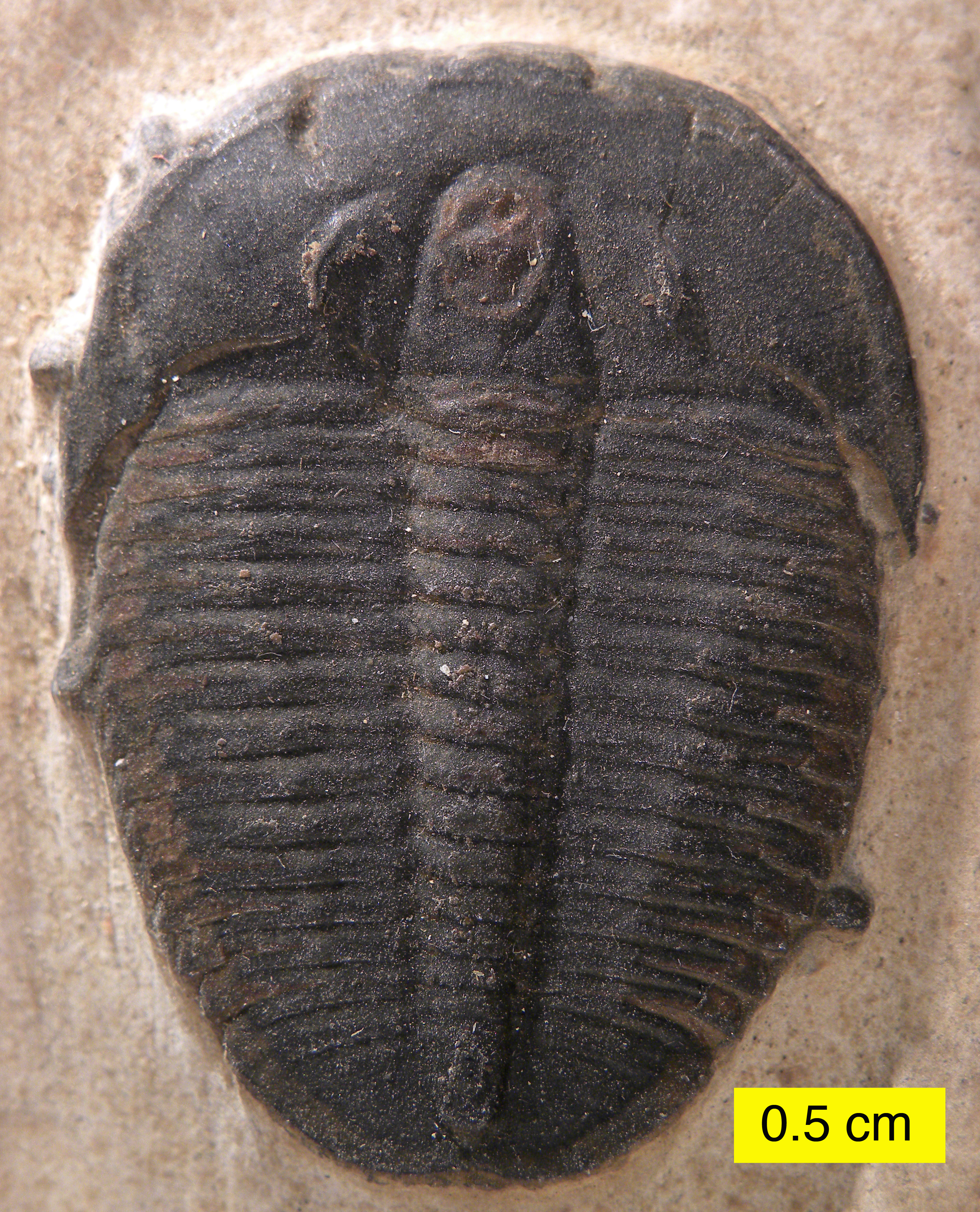
Elrathia kingii (trilobite) from the Wheeler Shale (Middle Cambrian), Utah.

Arthropods; jointed legged creatures with an exoskeleton.

- Subphylum Crustacea (crustaceans)
  - Class Ostracoda (ostracods)
  - Class Malacostraca (crabs, lobsters and most shrimp)
  - Class Branchiopoda (brine shrimp)
    - Order Notostraca
  - Class Cirripedia (barnacles)
  - Class Arachnoidea
- Subphylum Trilobitomorpha [†] (extinct trilobite group)
  - Class Trilobita [†] (the armoured trilobites)
- Subphylum Hexapoda
  - Class Insecta (insects, best preserved in amber)
- Subphylum Chelicerata
  - Class Arachnida (spiders, best preserved in amber)
  - Class Xiphosura ("living fossil" horseshoe crabs)
- Subphylum Myriapoda
  - Class Diplopoda
  - Class Chilopoda

=== Super-phylum of Deuterostomia / Enterocoelomata ===
Second-mouthed bilaterians called deuterostomians, such as chordates and echinoderms.

==== Phylum Echinodermata ====
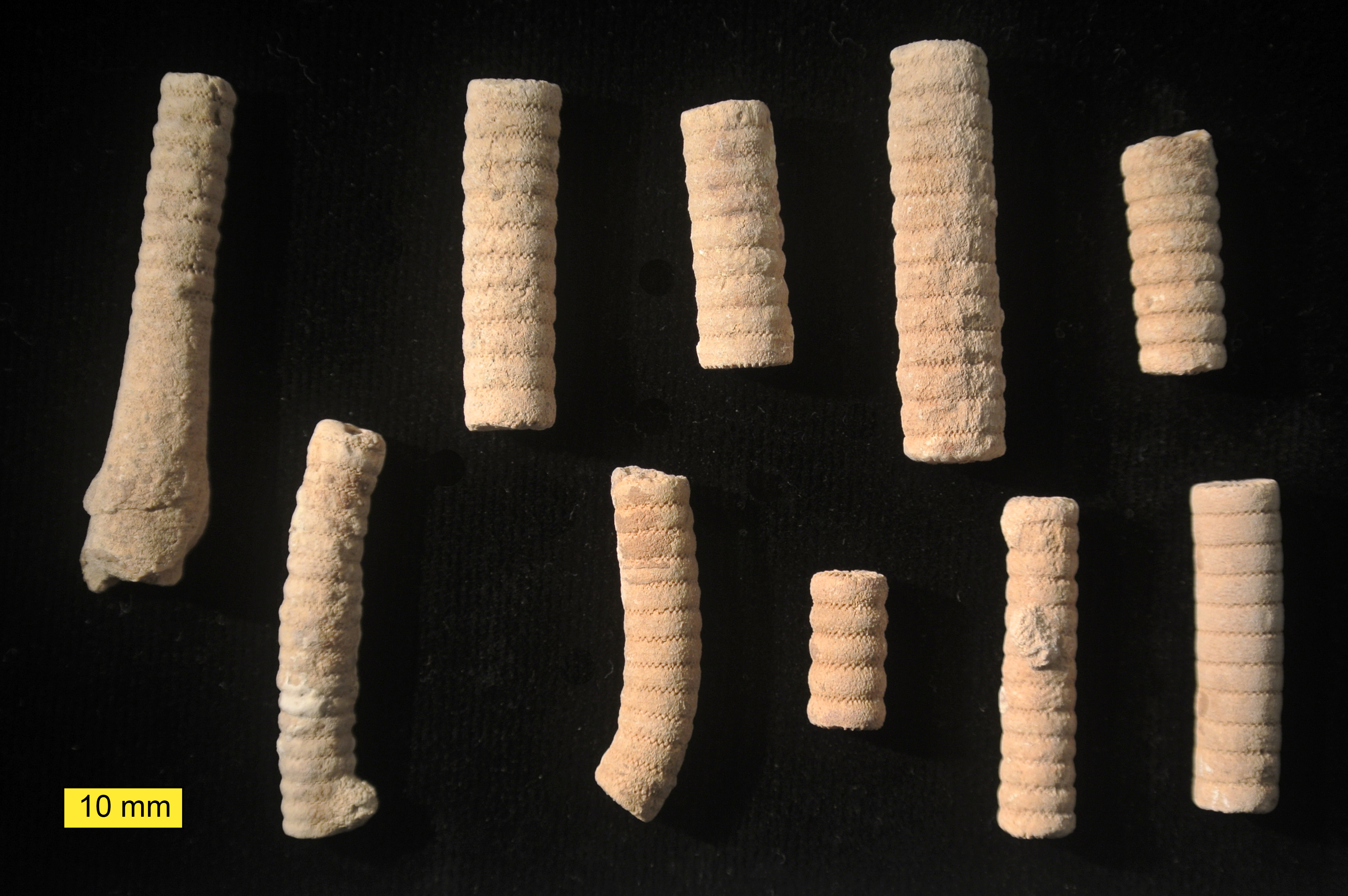
Middle Jurassic (Callovian) crinoid pluricolumnals (Apiocrinites) from the Matmor Formation in Hamakhtesh Hagadol, southern Israel.

Echinoderms – 72% of all documented species of Echinodermata are fossils and extinct.

- Subphylum Crinozoa (sessile echinoderms) – 91% of all documented species of Crinozoa are now extinct
  - Class Crinoidea (crinoids / sea lilies) – See Crinozoa above
- Subphylum Blastozoa [†] (extinct blastoids)
  - Class Diploporita
  - Class Rhombifera
- Subphylum Echinozoa (mobile echinoderms) – 89% of all documented species of Echinozoa are now extinct
  - Class Echinoidea (echinoids or sea urchins) – See Echinozoa above
    - Order Clypeasteroida
    - Order Camarodonta
- Subphylum Asterozoa
  - Class Asteroidea (sea stars/starfish)
  - Class Ophiuroidea

==== Phylum Hemichordata ====
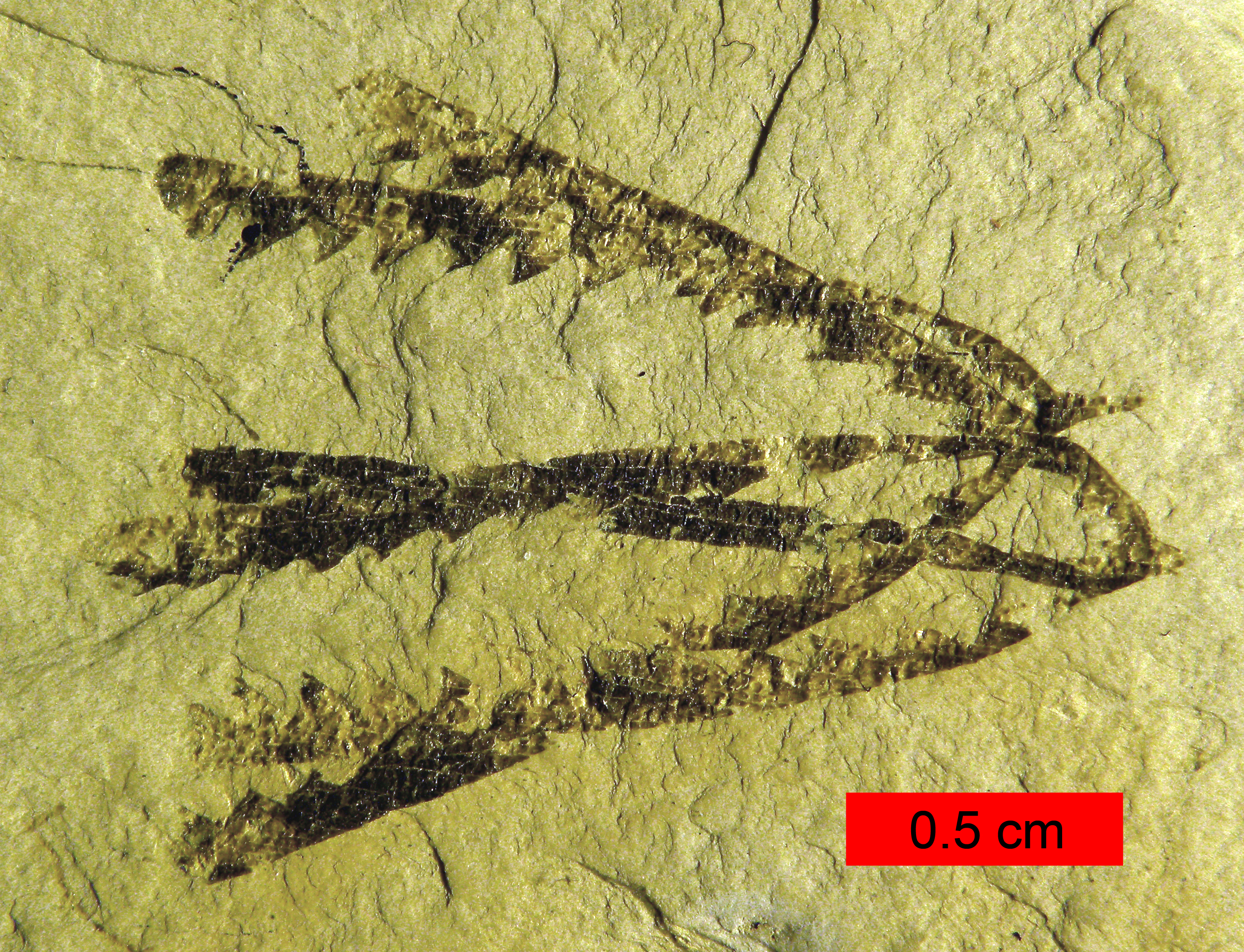
Pendeograptus fruticosus graptolites from the Bendigonian Australian Stage (Lower Ordovician) near Bendigo, Victoria, Australia. Two overlapping, three-stiped rhabdosomes.

Hemichordates such as extant acorn worms – Less than half of the documented species of Hemichordata are fossils and extinct.

- Class Graptoloidea [†] (extinct graptolites)
  - Order Dendroidea [†]
  - Order Graptoloidea [†]
    - Suborder Didymograptina [†]
    - Suborder Diplograptina [†]
    - Suborder Monograptina [†]

==== Phylum Chordata ====
Both invertebrate and vertebrate chordates; are animals possessing a notochord.

===== Invertebrate subphyla =====
- Subphylum Urochordata (invertebrate tunicate such as sea squirts)
- Subphylum Cephalochordata (invertebrate lancelets)

===== Subphylum Vertebrata =====
- Vertebrates such as hagfishes, lampreys, conodonts [†], ostracoderms [†], placoderms [†], sharks, ray-finned fishes, lobe-finned fishes, amphibians, reptiles, dinosaurs [†], birds and mammals.

== See also ==
- Invertebrate paleontology
