= Taxon-range zone =

In biostratigraphy, a subdiscipline of geology, a taxon-range zone is the zone between the highest and the lowest stratigraphic occurrence of a taxon. Taxon-range zones are one of the fundamental biozones used in biostratigraphy and are named after the taxon whose range they describe.

== Definition ==
The International Commission on Stratigraphy defines a Taxon-range zone as follows:

"The body of strata representing the known range of stratigraphic and geographic occurrence of specimens of a particular taxon. It is the sum of the documented occurrences in all individual sections and localities from which the particular taxon has been identified."

So a taxon-range zone is not only a vertical interval, but expands laterally. Taxon-range zones are limited at the top by the surface that connects all highest known stratigraphic occurrences of the taxon and are limited at the bottom by the surface that connects all lowest known stratigraphic occurrences of the taxon.

== Local Range ==
The local range of a taxon is the zone between the highest and the lowest stratigraphic occurrence of a taxon in a particular locality or area.

== See also ==
- Range offset
