= Stratigraphic paleobiology =

Branch of geology

Stratigraphic paleobiology is a branch of geology that is closely related to paleobiology, sequence stratigraphy and sedimentology. Stratigraphic paleobiology studies how the fossil record is altered by sedimentological processes and how this affects biostratigraphy and paleobiological interpretations of the fossil record.

== Topic and key concepts ==
Patzkowsky and Holland (2012) define stratigraphic paleobiology as follows:

"[Stratigraphic paleobiology] is built on the premise that the distribution of fossil taxa in time and space is controlled not only by processes of evolution, ecology, and environmental change, but also by the stratigraphic processes that govern where and when sediment that might contain fossils is deposited and preserved. Teasing apart the effects of these two suites of processes to understand the history of life on Earth is the essence of stratigraphic paleobiology."

Large parts of stratigraphic paleobiology rely on sequence stratigraphy. This is since within a sequence, many parameters such as depositional conditions, (non)preservation, and facies change deterministically. This sequence stratigraphic background alone, without any changes in ecology or any evolutionary processes, creates a baseline of constant change in the number of fossils and taxa that are preserved. One example for this are maximum flooding surfaces, which commonly display large accumulations of shells and an increased number of first fossil occurrences and last fossil occurrences. This is however not necessary linked to any change in ecology or an extinction event, but can be generated by the low deposition rates during the maximum flooding surface alone.

== See also ==
- Range offset
- Depositional resolution
