= Maria Léa Salgado-Labouriau =

Brazilian scientist (1931–2013)

- Born: 2 August 1931; Rio de Janeiro, Brazil
- Died: 13 July 2013 (aged 81); Brasília, Brazil
- Education: Federal University of Minas Gerais
- Known for: Studies of ecology and palaeobotany

Maria Léa Salgado-Labouriau (2 August 1931 – 13 July 2013) was a Brazilian scientist specialising in palaeobotany whose work in present and past ecology led her to be internationally known in her field. She was an emeritus professor at the University of Brasília (Brazil).

== Biography and scientific career ==
Maria Léa was born on 2 August 1931, in Rio de Janeiro, but grew up and spent a good part of her adult life in Minas Gerais. She completed her degree in Natural History at the Federal University of Minas Gerais in 1958, and her PhD in Biological Sciences (Botanics) at the University of São Paulo in 1972. Her research focused on the study of thousands of years old crystallised pollen from plants, spores and microscopic algae found in sediments from the quaternary period in the area of Planalto in the ecoregion of the Cerrado.

In 1974, she joined the Venezuelan Institute for Scientific Research (IVIC), where she worked as a researcher until 1987.

In 1979, she moved to the United States, where she realised her post-doctoral studies in Palynology, Pollen Morphology and Botanics at the Smithsonian Institution. Then, at the University of Minnesota, she studied Environmental Geology, Stratigraphic Palaeontology and Geographic Climatology.

Back in Brazil in 1988, she became a titular professor at the Institute of Geosciences at the University of Brasília, where she worked until her retirement in 1993. She died on 13 July 2013, aged 81, in Brasília

== Contributions and legacy ==
Her main scientific contributions are related to the study of the environment in the high mountains in the Andes range and at the central area of area of Planalto (Cerrado), with insights into climate evolution in the past. She used this knowledge to do more research on the regeneration of the vegetation of the climate. She also played an important role in the education of numerous scientific researchers.

== Memberships and recognitions ==
- Member of the Brazilian Society for Science Progress (in Portuguese, Sociedade Brasileira para o Progresso da Ciência, SBPC).
- Fellow of the John Simon Guggenheim Memorial Foundation.
- Member of the International Association for Aerobiology (IAA).
- Referee of the international scientific journal GRANA.
- Director of the Latin American Centre for Biological Sciences (in Spanish, Centro Latinoamericano de Ciencias Biológicas, UNESCO-CLAB).
- President of the Sub-commission for the Holocene in South America at the International Union for Quaternary Research (INQUA).
- Member of the New York Sciences Academy.
- Jabuti Prize for her book História Ecológica da Terra (Ecologic history of Earth), 2001.

== Relevant publications ==
- Salgado-Labouriau, M. L. Critérios e Técnicas para o Quaternário. São Paulo: Editora Edgard Blücher, 2006.
- Salgado-Labouriau, M. L. História Ecológica da Terra. 2. ed. São Paulo: Editora Edgard Blücher, 2001.
- Salgado-Labouriau, M. L. (Org.) El Medio Ambiente Páramo. 1. ed. Caracas: Ediciones CEA/IVIC/UNESCO, 1979.
- Salgado-Labouriau, M. L. Contribuição à Palinologia dos Cerrados. 1. ed. Rio de Janeiro: Academia Brasil. Ciências, 1973.
