= Range offset =

In geology, range offset is the time difference between the last fossil occurrence of a taxon and the actual disappearance of this taxon. Range offset can be used as a measure of biostratigraphic precision and determines among others how much information about extinctions can be derived from fossil occurrences.

== Definition ==
The range offset of a taxon is defined as

- The temporal gap extends from the deposition of the taxon's highest stratigraphic occurrence to its disappearance from the locality. Additionally, it encompasses the time from the taxon's initial appearance in the area to the deposition of its lowest stratigraphic occurrence.
- It includes the duration between the highest stratigraphic occurrence of the taxon's deposition and its subsequent disappearance from the locality. Also, it covers the time from the taxon's first appearance in the area to the deposition of its lowest stratigraphic occurrence.

== Effects of sequence stratigraphy ==
Range offset is strongly affected by sequence stratigraphy. Simulations show that range offset changes by up to three orders of magnitude dependent on the position in the systems tracts.
