= Dinosaur biostratigraphy =

Dinosaur biostratigraphy studies the distribution of dinosaur taxa through rock layers. It can be useful for dating and correlating rock units and reconstructing ancient ecosystems. Most dinosaur-bearing rock formations do not contain multiple distinct stratigraphically separated faunas. Typically dinosaur faunas are static throughout a formation or change piecemeal over time. Faunal turnover usually occurs between formations. The fossil record can give an appearance of faunal turnover due to multiple causes including evolution, migration, or changing preservational biases. Turnover events can have extremely minor causes like the migration of a taxon to a new area or extremely conspicuous ones like an ecosystem destroying catastrophe. Since the fossil record is incomplete assessing the nature and causes of faunal turnovers is fraught with difficulty, except in cases where the fossil record is "unusually complete."

== Dinosaur Park Formation ==
The Dinosaur Park Formation can be divided into at least two distinct faunas. The lower part of the formation is characterized by the abundance of Corythosaurus and Centrosaurus. This group of species is replaced higher in the formation by a different ornithischian fauna characterized by the presence of Lambeosaurus and Styracosaurus. The appearance of several new, rare species of ornithischian at the very top of the formation may indicate that a third distinct fauna had replaced the second during the transition into younger, non-Dinosaur Park sediments, at the same time an inland sea transgresses onto land, but there are fewer remains here. An unnamed pachyrhinosaur, Chasmosaurus irvinensis, and Lambeosaurus magnicristatus may be more common in this third fauna.

The timeline below follows a synthesis presented by Arbour et al. 2009 with additional information from Evans et al. 2009

== Horseshoe Canyon Formation ==
The timeline below follows a synthesis presented by Arbour et al. 2009.

== Two Medicine Formation ==
Most dinosaur-bearing rock formations do not contain multiple distinct faunas at different positions within the formation's stratigraphic column. Usually the lower sediments of a given formation will contain the same kinds of dinosaurs as the upper sediments, or the species composition changes only gradually. However, some researchers had argued that the Two Medicine Formation was an exception, preserving multiple distinct dinosaur faunas.

Later research came to find that the supposedly distinct dinosaur faunas at different levels of the formations were more similar than had been previously thought. While the dinosaur fauna of the lower and middle sections Two Medicine was apparently diverse, the quality of preservation was low and few of these remains can be referred to individual species. The middle Two Medicine is a better source of fossils, but still poor overall. This makes it difficult to argue that these sections of the formation preserve distinct faunas.

The upper portion of the formation is more diverse and preserves better quality fossils. However, many of the taxa that supposedly distinguished it as a separate fauna have since been found in older sediments. In particular, Gryposaurus latidens and Hypacrosaurus have been found to coexist with Maiasaura. Further, there are fossil teeth that seem to show the presence of certain taxa are unbroken throughout the whole formation.

Nevertheless, some true changes in faunal composition seem to occur in the upper Two Medicine. The appearance of Maiasaura in the formation precedes the arrival of a diverse variety of other ornithischians. According to David Trexler, thorough examination of strata found along the Two Medicine River (which exposes the entire upper half of the Two Medicine Formation) indicates that the apparent diversification was a real event rather than a result of preservational biases.
