= Invertebrate paleontology =

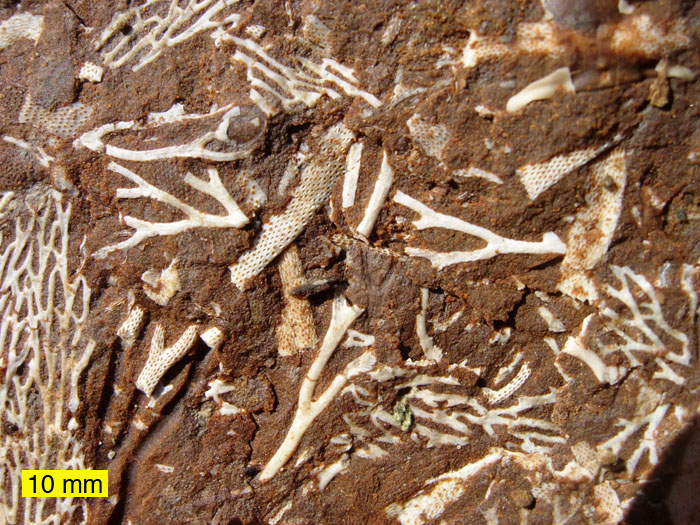
Bryozoan fossils in an Ordovician oil shale from Estonia. Field of view is 15 cm across.

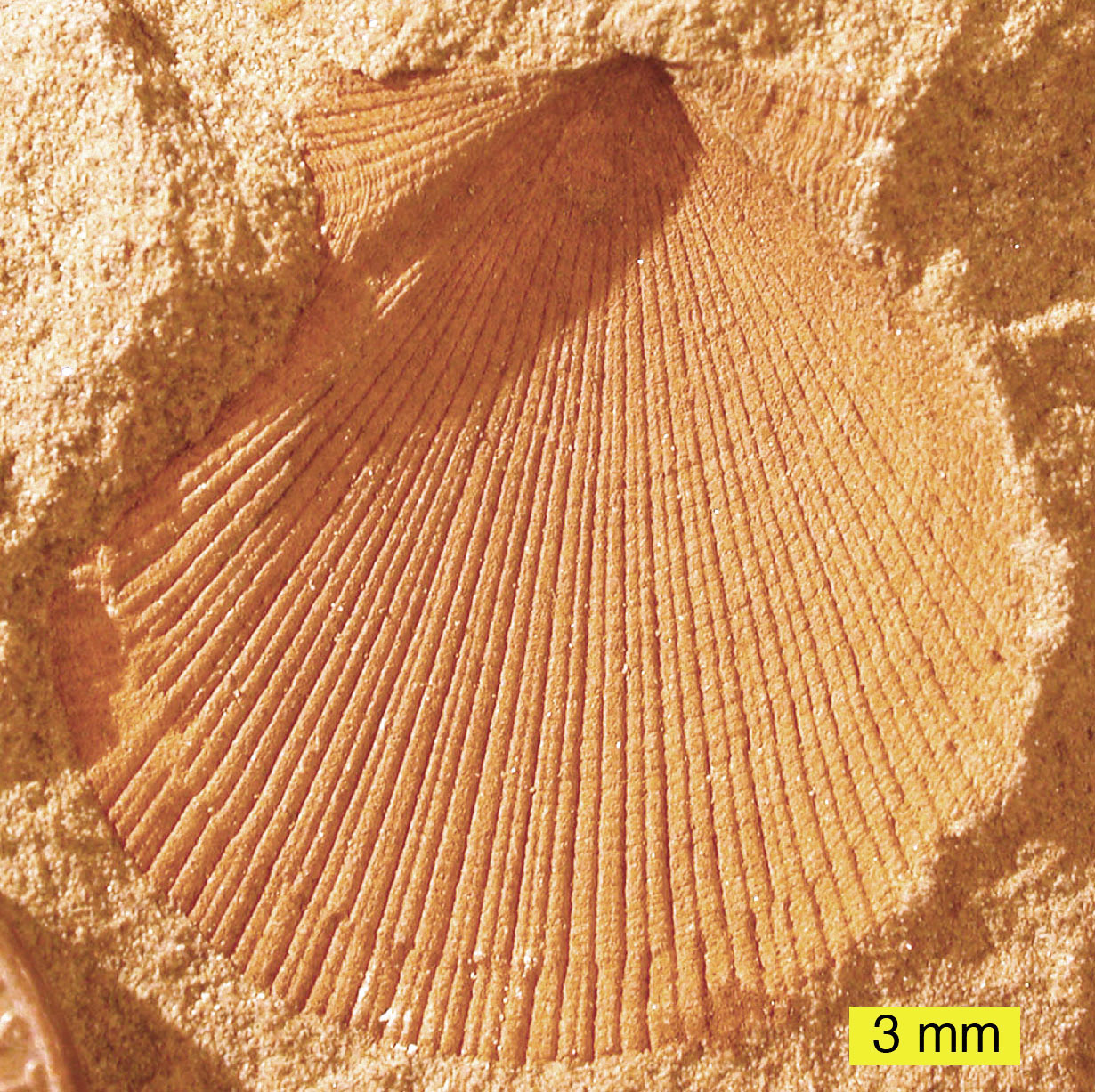
Aviculopecten subcardiformis; an extinct pectenoid from the Logan Formation (Lower Carboniferous) of Wooster, Ohio (external mold).

Invertebrate paleontology (also spelled invertebrate palaeontology) is sometimes described as invertebrate paleozoology or invertebrate paleobiology. Whether it is considered to be a subfield of paleontology, paleozoology, or paleobiology, this discipline is the scientific study of prehistoric invertebrates by analyzing invertebrate fossils in the geologic record.

By invertebrates are meant the non-vertebrate creatures of the kingdom Animalia (or Metazoa) in the biotic domain of Eukaryota. By phyletic definition, these many-celled, sub-vertebrate animals lack a vertebral column, spinal column, vertebrae, backbone, or long, full-length notochord—in contrast to the vertebrates in the one phylum of Chordata.

Relatedly, invertebrates have never had a cartilaginous or boney internal skeleton, with its skeletal supports, gill slits, ribs and jaws. Finally, throughout geologic time, invertebrates have remained non-craniate creatures; that is, they never developed a cranium, nerve-chord brain, skull, or hard protective braincase (unlike many vertebrates).

== Invertebrate terminology in science ==
In the many decades since Jean-Baptiste de Lamarck, a pioneering biologist and evolutionist, first conceptualized and coined the category "Invertebrata" (between 1793 and 1801) and the term "Biology" (in 1802), zoology has come to recognize that the non-vertebrate category is not a scientifically valid, monophyletic taxon. Evolutionary biology and developmental biology (a.k.a. "evo-devo") now consider the term "Invertebrata" to be both polyphyletic and paraphyletic. Nevertheless, most earth science departments continue to employ this term; and paleontologists find it both useful and practical in evaluating fossil invertebrates and—consequently—invertebrate evolution.

However, there is one contemporary caveat: Paleobiologists and microbiologists in the 21st century no longer classify one-celled "animal-like" microbes either as invertebrates or as animals. For example, the commonly fossilized foraminifera ("forams") and radiolarians—zooplankton both formerly grouped under either an animal phylum or animal sub-kingdom called Protozoa ("first animals")—are now placed in the kingdom or super-kingdom Protista or Protoctista (and thus called protists or protoctists).

Thus modern invertebrate paleontologists deal largely with fossils of this more strictly defined Animal Kingdom (excepting Phylum Chordata), Phylum Chordata being the exclusive focus of vertebrate paleontology. Protist fossils are then the main focus of micropaleontology, while plant fossils are the chief focus paleobotany. Together these four represent the traditional taxonomic divisions of paleontologic study.

== Invertebrate fossilization ==
When it comes to the fossil record, soft-bodied and minuscule invertebrates—such as hydras, jellies, flatworms, hairworms, nematodes, ribbon worms, rotifers and roundworms—are infrequently fossilized. As a result, paleontologists and other fossil hunters must often rely on trace fossils, microfossils, or chemofossil residue when scouting for these prehistoric creatures.

Hard-bodied and large invertebrates are much more commonly preserved; typically as sizeable macrofossils. These invertebrates are more frequently preserved because their hard parts fossilise more readily—for example, shell, armor, plates, tests, exoskeleton, jaws or teeth. In invertebrates, these parts are composed of silica (silicon dioxide), calcite or aragonite (both forms of calcium carbonate), chitin (a protein often infused with tricalcium phosphate), or keratin (an even-more complex protein), rather than the vertebrate bone (hydroxyapatite) or cartilage of fishes and land-dwelling tetrapods.

The chitinous jaws of annelids (such as the marine scolecodonts) are sometimes preserved as fossils; while many arthropods and inarticulate brachiopods have easily fossilized hard parts of calcite, chitin, or keratin. The most common and often-found macrofossils are the very hard calcareous shells of articulate brachiopods (that is, the everyday "lampshells") and of mollusks (such as the omnipresent clams, snails, mussels and oysters). On the other hand, shell-less slugs and non-tubiferous worms (for instance, earthworms) lack hard parts and therefore such organisms are poorly represented in the fossil record.
