= Macrofossil =

Preserved organic remains large enough to be visible without a microscope

Macrofossils, also known as megafossils, are the preserved remnants of organic beings and their activities that are large enough to be visible without a microscope. Microfossils, by contrast, require substantial magnification for evaluation by fossil-hunters or professional paleontologists. As a result, most fossils observed in the field and most specimens are macrofossils. Macrofossils come in many varieties and form in various ways depending on their environment and what is being fossilized including plant, fungi and animal remnants.

== Historical background ==
=== Etymology ===
The origins of the term macrofossil date back to 1937 and was first used by G. D. Hanna, a US paleontologist and malacologist.

=== Scientific thought ===
Macrofossils have been subject to analysis since ancient times. Several Greek philosophers used fossilized shellfish to theorize the land was once covered by oceans. Macrofossils of body parts have been used to reconstruct extinct animals and provide basis for evolutionary lineages. Georges Cuvier, a naturalist, zoologist and the founding father of paleontology, along with other natural thinkers during the Age of Reason presented fossils as integral evidence in the changing views of natural philosophy at the time from the application of new mathematics and other emerging branches of science. This brought about the acceptance of paleontology as a true scientific discipline. This also greatly affected the development of geology and stratigraphy as new schools of science. This led to other scientific thinkers like Charles Darwin, a naturalist, biologist and geologist, to begin using macrofossils as evidence in a new scientific discipline called evolutionary biology.

== Varieties ==
=== Plant macrofossils ===
Plant macrofossils include leaf, needle, cone, and stem debris; and can be used to identify types of plants formerly growing in the area. Such botanical macrofossil data provide a valuable complement to pollen and faunal data that can be used to reconstruct the prehistoric terrestrial environment. Algal macrofossils (for instance, brown kelp, sea lettuce and large stromatolites) are increasingly used to analyze prehistoric marine and aquatic ecosystems. The study of these fossils is called paleobotany. Plant macrofossils are increasingly being used along with pollen microfossils to reconstruct past climates.

=== Vertebrate macrofossils ===
Vertebrate macrofossils include the teeth, skulls, and bones. Vertebrate macrofossils are used to reconstruct extinct animals, determine their behaviors and how they evolved. Well preserved body fossils are of particular use in helping to reassemble extinct animal body structures.

=== Invertebrate macrofossils ===
Invertebrate macrofossils include remains such as shells, tests, faunal armor, and exoskeletons. The bodies of small and soft bodied invertebrates rarely fossilize. Meanwhile, large and hard bodied invertebrates more commonly fossilize. The study of these fossils is a subdivision of paleontology called invertebrate paleontology.

=== Fungi macrofossils ===
Fungi macrofossils include fungal bodies and filaments. Most fungi fossils are found in amber. Fungi fossils are under-researched compared to animal and plant fossils. Macrofossils of fungi are rarer and are more commonly found as microfossils. The study of these fossils is called paleomycology.

=== Trace macrofossils ===
Trace macrofossils are fossilized evidence of animal behavior. These may include tracks, burrows and dung (coprolites). Trace fossils are the primary type of fossils used by paleontologist to reconstruct extinct animal behaviors. The study of these fossils is called Ichnology.

=== Chemo macrofossils ===
Chemo-fossils are the fossilized chemical remains of an organism. For example coal is the fossilized chemical remains of extinct plant matter.

== Image gallery ==
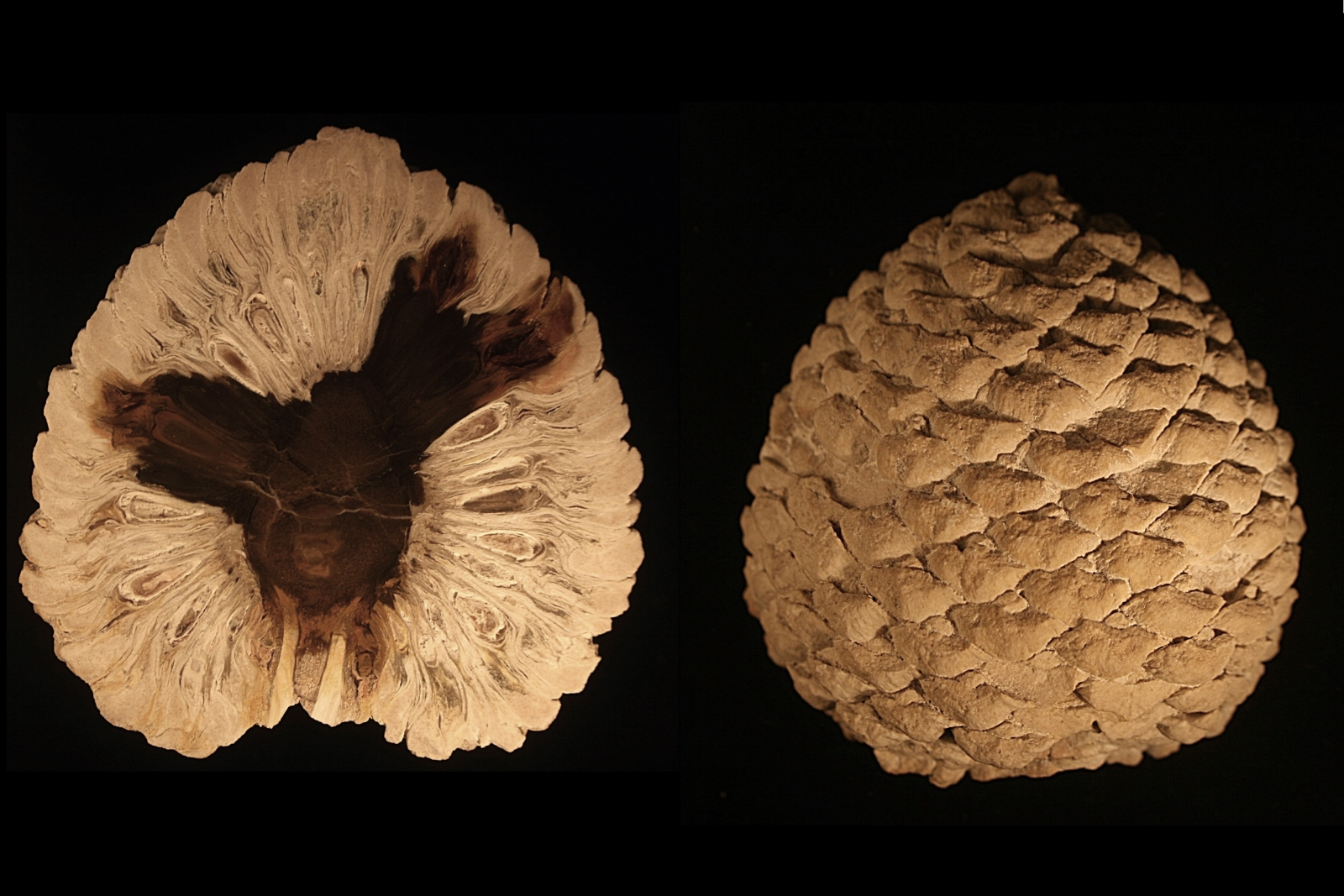
Jurassic Petrified cone of Araucaria sp. from Patagonia, Argentina.

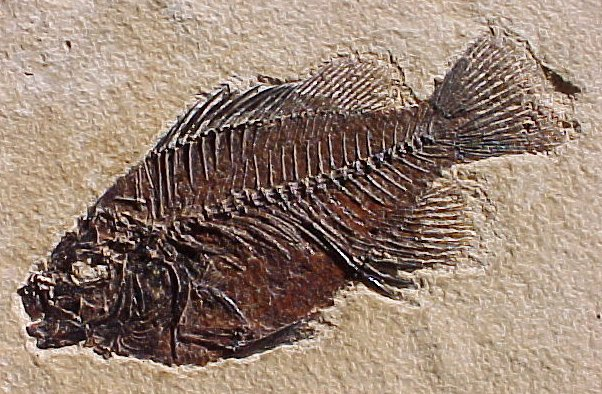
Eocene fossil fish Priscacara liops from the Green River Formation of Utah.

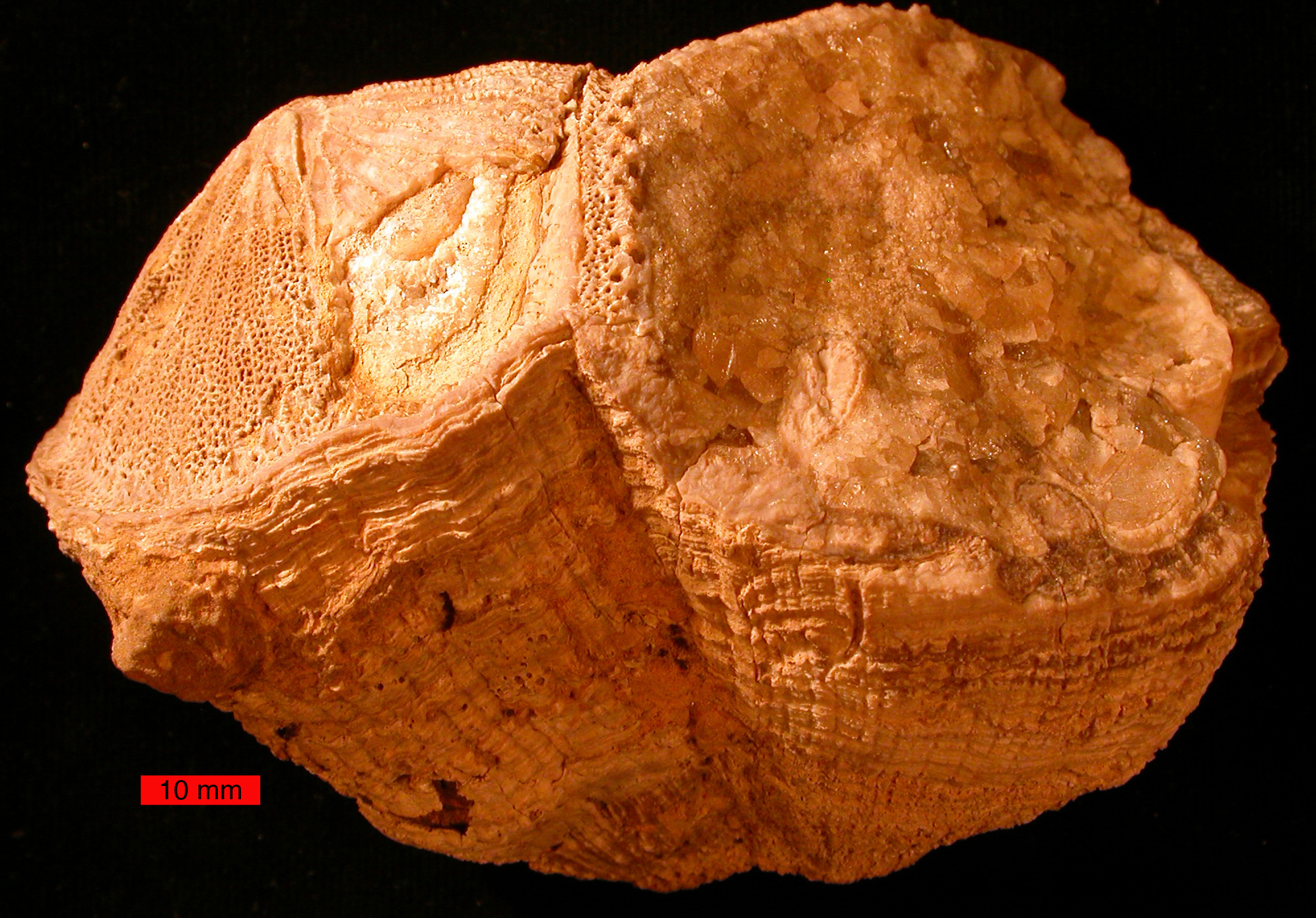
Rudist bivalves from the Cretaceous of the Omani Mountains, United Arab Emirates. Scale bar is 10 mm.

The enigmatic Ediacaran lifeform known as Palaeopascichnus is known as a Macrofossil.
