= Paleomycology =

Study of organic evolution of fungi based on fossils

Paleomycology is the study of fossil fungi. Although fungi are not plants, paleomycology is considered a subdiscipline of paleobotany, centered on mushrooms, fungal spores, and hyphae preserved in sediment layers and rock. Fungi have been found in the palaeoecological record as far back as the Paleozoic era, with evidence of influencing the evolutionary processes of early flowering plants.

== History ==
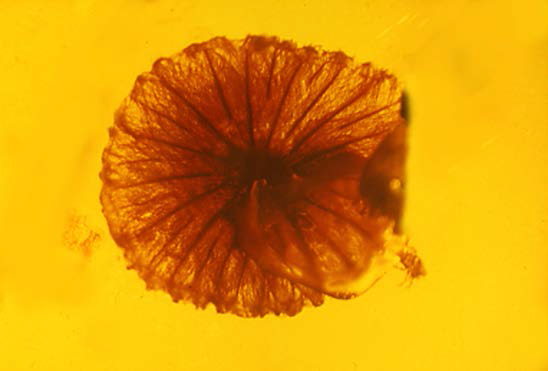
Gilled mushroom (Coprinites dominicana) preserved in amber

Interest in fossilized fungi dates back to the early nineteenth century, with the first illustrated collection being curated by Luigi Meschinelli in 1898. It focused on matching fossils to modern fungi. Historically, however, paleoecologists tend to place a larger focus on plant and animal macrofossils, partially due to the difficulty and unfamiliarity in identifying fungi physiology and morphology.

== Early Discovery ==
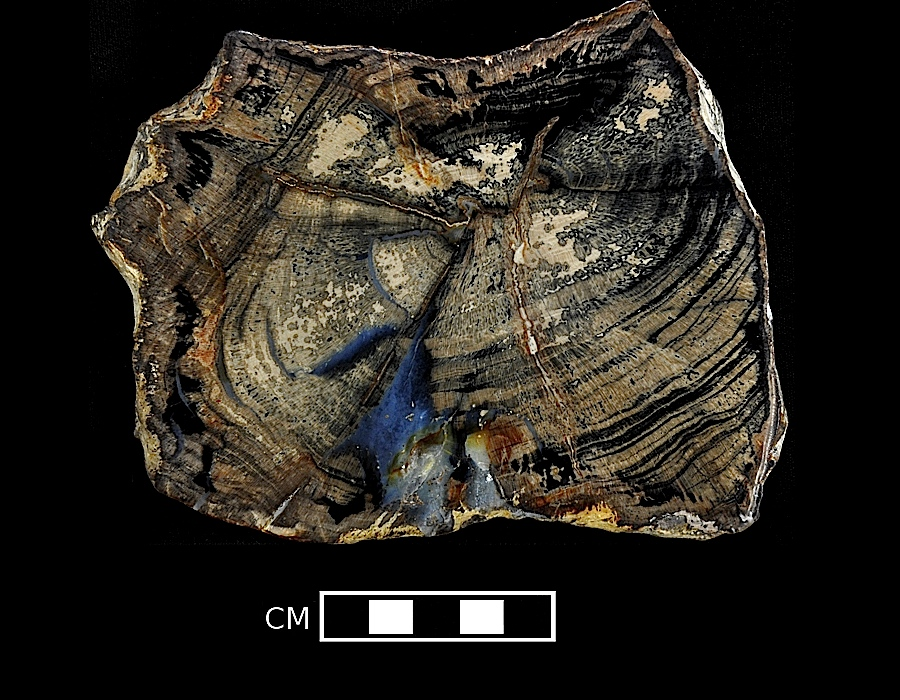
Callixylon whiteanum

A majority of fossilized fungi remains, such as spores and sclerotia, are discovered in amber. Two particular discoveries of fossil fungi, one in the Baltic Sea dated to the Eocene and another in the Dominican Republic dated to the Miocene, are important for comparison across timescales and for the development of the evolutionary record. A sample of amber from the Baltic site preserved a hexapod and the fungi Aspergillus collembolorum, which suggests the presence of parasitic relationships as early as 34 million years ago. Fossil fungi present indirect evidence of when symbiotic relationships coevolved, such as saprophytism or commensalism among mycorrhizae or lichen. The presence of wood-rotting fungi in Callixylon whiteanum, one of the oldest identified trees, suggests that saprophytic interactions between plants and fungi evolved when wood first began to develop.

== Ecological Importance ==
=== Evolutionary relationships ===
Fungi require a carbon source for growth and development, which is provided by the decomposition of organic plant and animal matter. Mycorrhizal relationships between plants and fungi are mutualistic: the fungus gains a carbon source, while the plant receives nutrient minerals. Discovery of fungi in the Early Devonian Rhynie chert, when plants were root and leafless, suggests that fungi played a large role in the evolution of plant life into terrestrial ecosystems.

Fungal endophytes and epiphytes, similarly to mycorrhizae, establish a symbiotic relationship with plant hosts through which they obtain their necessary nutrients, however the lack of fossil endophytes on plant leaves prior to the Cretaceous period suggests that leaves as a fungal habitat were exploited by fungi after flowering plants evolved about 130 million years ago. The use of fungal epi- and endophytes in the fossil record can be used to determine the evolutionary modifications required to colonize certain ecosystems, as well as to identify the environmental tolerances of fungi, their potential as palaeoclimatological proxies (for instance, the presence of Sporormiella being used to reconstruct megaherbivore extinction), and future use in identifying extinct morphologies. Evidence of bioeroder fungi has been identified in carbonate substrates (such as in shells) in which organic carbon-containing matter was extracted, indicating the presence of a mutualistic or parasitic relationship between a fungus and host.

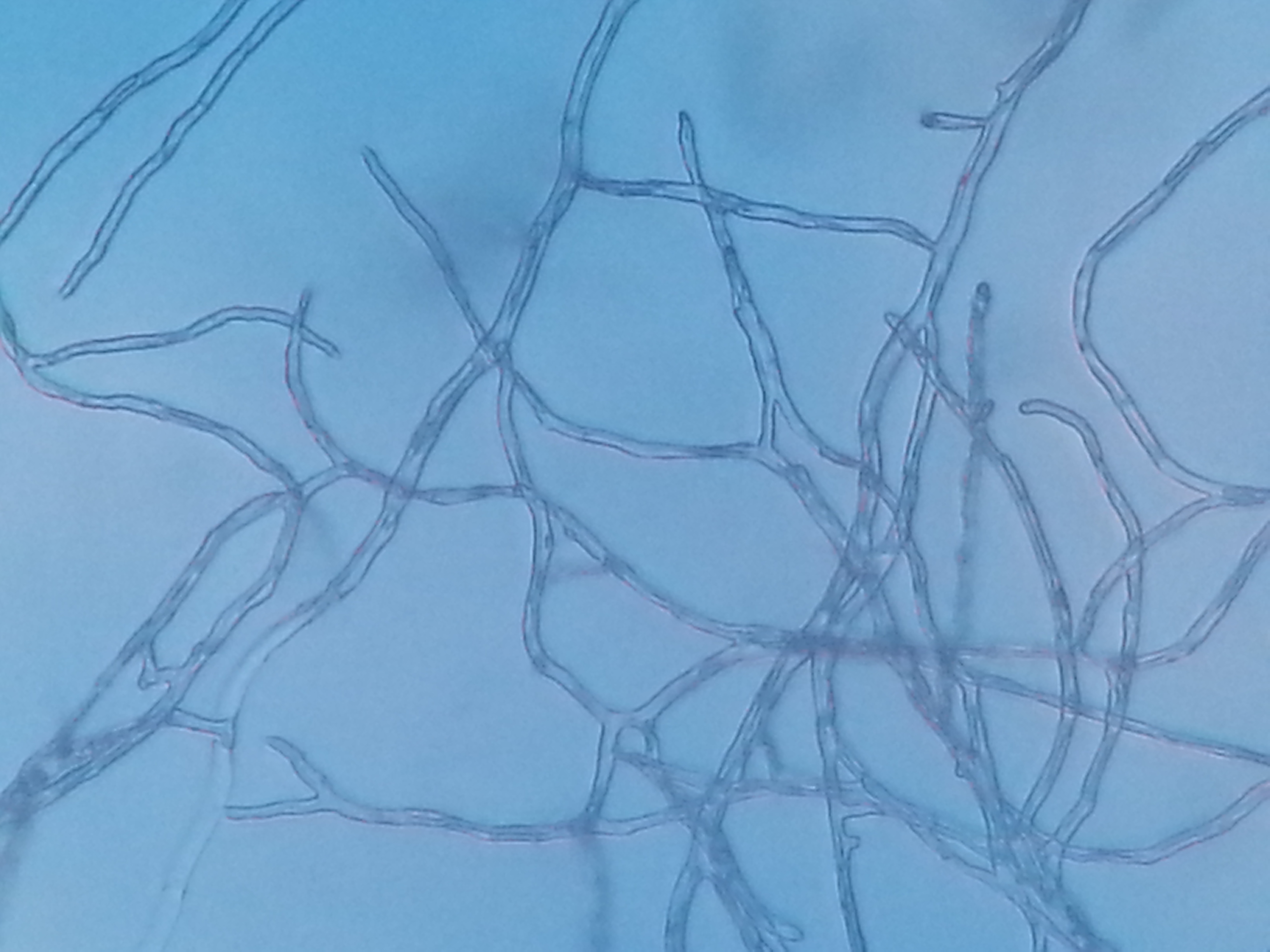
Fungal hyphae

Fungi have not only been identified as bioeroders, but also as part of a food chain. The presence of fungal hyphae and spores in coprolites suggests that arthropods depended on fungi as a food source.

=== Interdisciplinary uses ===
Fossilized fungal organisms are important to geological evolutionary history. The weathering of rocks and nutrient cycling in mineral media show the impact and spread of microbial fungi in geological processes.

== See also ==
- Evolution of fungi
- Mycology
- Paleontology
