= Inarticulata =

Class of brachiopods

Inarticulata was historically defined as one of the two classes of the phylum Brachiopoda and referred to those having no hinge. The other class was Articulata, meaning articulated — having a hinge between the dorsal and ventral valves. These classifications have now been superseded, see brachiopod classification.

== See also ==
- Treatise on Invertebrate Paleontology — also mentions the new Brachiopoda classification system
