= Biostratigraphy =

Stratigraphy which assigns ages of rock strata by using fossils

Biostratigraphy is the branch of stratigraphy which focuses on correlating and assigning relative ages of rock strata by using the fossil assemblages contained within them. The primary objective of biostratigraphy is correlation, demonstrating that a particular horizon in one geological section represents the same period of time as another horizon at a different section. Fossils within these strata are useful because sediments of the same age can look completely different, due to local variations in the sedimentary environment. For example, one section might have been made up of clays and marls, while another has more chalky limestones. However, if the fossil species recorded are similar, the two sediments are likely to have been laid down around the same time. Ideally these fossils are used to help identify biozones, as they make up the basic biostratigraphy units, and define geological time periods based upon the fossil species found within each section.

Basic concepts of biostratigraphic principles were introduced in the early 1800s. A Danish scientist and bishop by the name of Nicolas Steno was one of the first geologists to recognize that rock layers correlate to the Law of Superposition. With advancements in science and technology, by the 18th century it began to be accepted that fossils were remains left by species that had become extinct, but were then preserved within the rock record. The method was well-established before Charles Darwin explained the mechanism behind it—evolution. Scientists William Smith, George Cuvier, and Alexandre Brongniart came to the conclusion that fossils then indicated a series of chronological events, establishing layers of rock strata as some type of unit, later termed biozone. From here on, scientists began relating the changes in strata and biozones to different geological eras, establishing boundaries and time periods within major faunal changes. By the late 18th century the Cambrian and Carboniferous periods were internationally recognized due to these findings. During the early 20th century, advancements in technology gave scientists the ability to study radioactive decay. Using this methodology, scientists were able to establish geological time, the boundaries of the different eras (Paleozoic, Mesozoic, Cenozoic), as well as Periods (Cambrian, Ordovician, Silurian) through the isotopes found within fossils via radioactive decay. Current 21st century uses of biostratigraphy involve interpretations of age for rock layers, which are primarily used by oil and gas industries for drilling workflows and resource allocations.

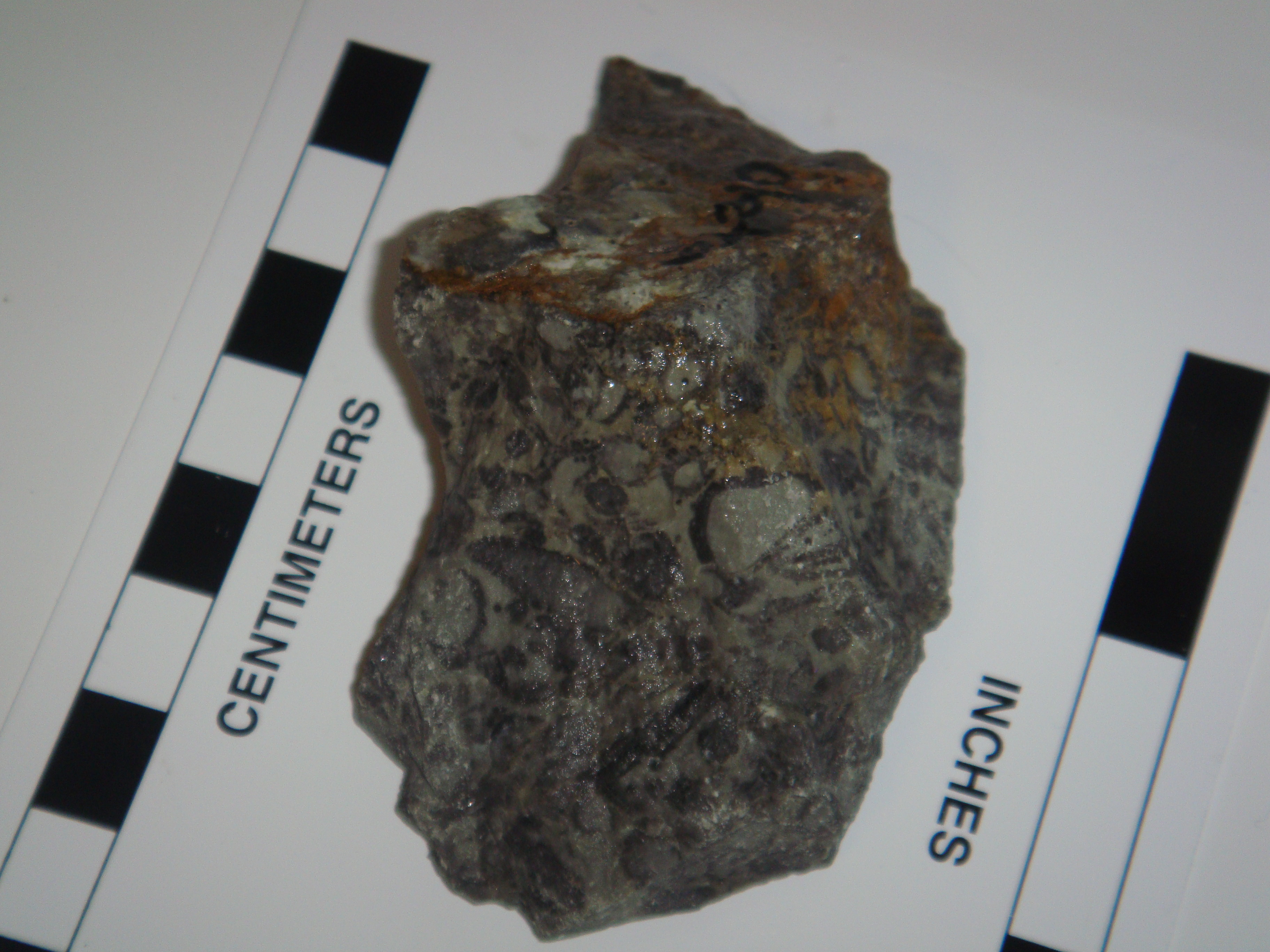
The first reef builder is a worldwide index fossil for the Lower Cambrian

== Fossils as a basis for stratigraphic subdivision ==
Fossil assemblages were traditionally used to designate the duration of periods. Since a large change in fauna was required to make early stratigraphers create a new period, most of the periods we recognize today are terminated by a major extinction event or faunal turnover.

=== Concept of stage ===
A stage is a major subdivision of strata, each systematically following the other each bearing a unique assemblage of fossils. Therefore, stages can be defined as a group of strata containing the same major fossil assemblages. French palaeontologist Alcide d'Orbigny is credited for the invention of this concept. He named stages after geographic localities with particularly good sections of rock strata that bear the characteristic fossils on which the stages are based.

=== Concept of zone ===
In 1856 German palaeontologist Albert Oppel introduced the concept of zone (also known as biozones or Oppel zone). A zone includes strata characterized by the overlapping range of fossils. They represent the time between the appearance of species chosen at the base of the zone and the appearance of other species chosen at the base of the next succeeding zone. Oppel's zones are named after a particular distinctive fossil species, called an index fossil. Index fossils are one of the species from the assemblage of species that characterize the zone.

Biostratigraphy uses zones for the most fundamental unit of measurement. The thickness and range of these zones can be a few meters, up to hundreds of meters. They can also range from local to worldwide, as the extent of which they can reach in the horizontal plane relies on tectonic plates and tectonic activity. Two of the tectonic processes that run the risk of changing these zones' ranges are metamorphic folding and subduction. Furthermore, biostratigraphic units are divided into six principal kinds of biozones: Taxon range biozone, Concurrent range biozone, Interval biozone, Lineage biozone, Assemblage biozone, and Abundance biozone.

The Taxon range biozone represents the known stratigraphic and geographic range of occurrence of a single taxon. Concurrent range biozone includes the concurrent, coincident, or overlapping part of the range of two specified taxa. Interval biozones include the strata between two specific biostratigraphic surfaces and can be based on lowest or highest occurrences. Lineage biozones are strata containing species representing a specific segment of an evolutionary lineage. Assemblage biozones are strata that contain a unique association of three or more taxa within it. Abundance biozones are strata in which the abundance of a particular taxon or group of taxa is significantly greater than in the adjacent part of the section.

==== Index fossils ====
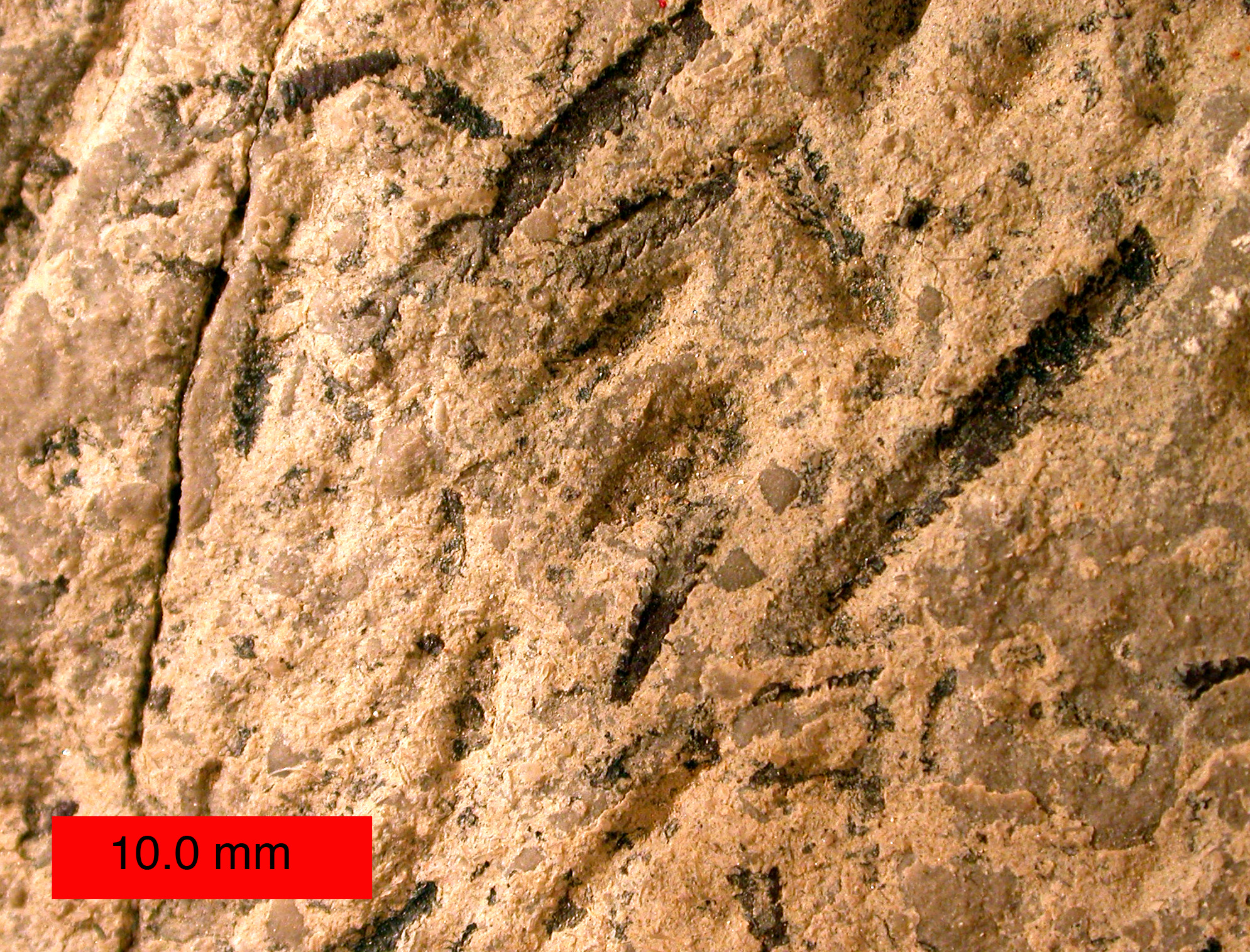
Amplexograptus, a graptolite index fossil, from the Ordovician near Caney Springs, Tennessee.

Index fossils (also known as guide fossils, indicator fossils, or dating fossils) are the fossilized remains or traces of particular plants or animals that are characteristic of a particular span of geologic time or environment, and can be used to identify and date the containing rocks. To be practical, index fossils must have a limited vertical time range, wide geographic distribution, and rapid evolutionary trends. Rock formations separated by great distances but containing the same index fossil species are thereby known to have both formed during the limited time that the species lived.

Index fossils were originally used to define and identify geologic units, then became a basis for defining geologic periods, and then for faunal stages and zones.

Ammonites, graptolites, archeocyathids, inoceramids, and trilobites are groups of animals from which many species have been identified as index fossils that are widely used in biostratigraphy. Species of microfossils such as acritarchs, chitinozoans, conodonts, dinoflagellate cysts, ostracods, pollen, spores and foraminiferans are also frequently used. Different fossils work well for sediments of different ages; trilobites, for example, are particularly useful for sediments of Cambrian age. A long series of ammonite and inoceramid species are particularly useful for correlating environmental events around the world during the super-greenhouse of the Late Cretaceous.

To work well, the fossils used must be widespread geographically, so that they can be found in many different places. They must also be short-lived as a species, so that the period of time during which they could be incorporated in the sediment is relatively narrow. The longer lived the species, the poorer the stratigraphic precision, so fossils that evolve rapidly, such as ammonites, are favored over forms that evolve much more slowly, like nautiloids.

Often biostratigraphic correlations are based on a faunal assemblage, rather than an individual species — this allows greater precision as the time span in which all of the species in the assemblage existed together is narrower than the time spans of any of the members. Furthermore, if only one species is present in a sample, it can mean either that (1) the strata were formed in the known fossil range of that organism; or (2) that the fossil range of the organism was incompletely known, and the strata extend the known fossil range. For instance, the presence of the trace fossil Treptichnus pedum was used to define the base of the Cambrian period, but it has since been found in older strata. If the fossil is easy to preserve and easy to identify, more precise time estimating of the stratigraphic layers is possible.

In terrestrial late Miocene, Pliocene and Pleistocene sediments, vole teeth are frequently used as index fossils (sometimes called the "vole clock"). Some authors have argued that based on size variation that vole teeth can be used to date certain deposits with high precision, but this assumption has been criticised, as changes in the size of vole teeth are not unidirectional through time and frequently prone to trend reversal.

==== Faunal succession ====
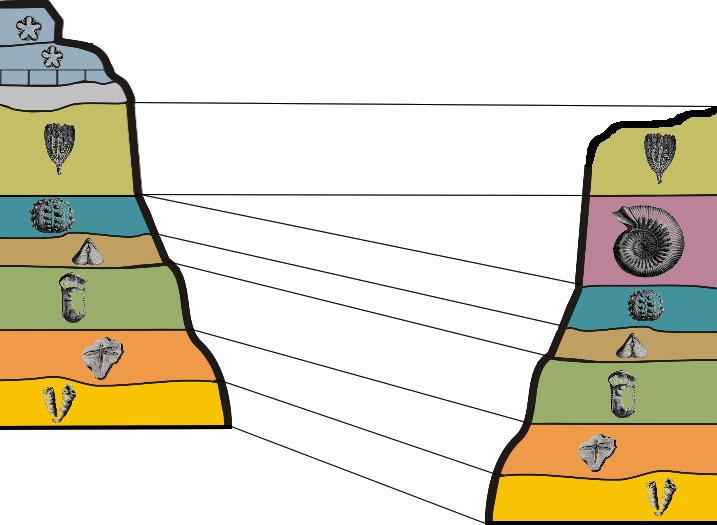
Image displaying newly discovered fossil being introduced into the succession sequence.

The concept of faunal succession was theorized at the beginning of the 19th century by William Smith. When Smith was studying rock strata, he began to recognize that rock outcrops contained a unique collection of fossils. The idea that these distant rock outcrops contained similar fossils allowed Smith to order rock formations throughout England. With Smith's work on these rock outcrops and mapping around England, he began to notice some beds of rock may contain mostly similar species, however there were also subtle differences within or between these fossil groups. This difference in assemblages that appeared identical at first, led to the principle of faunal succession, where fossil organisms succeed one another in a definite and determinable order, and therefore any time period can be categorized by its fossil extent.

== See also ==
- Biochronology
- Chronostratigraphy
- Conodont biostratigraphy
- Dinosaur biostratigraphy
- Lithostratigraphy
- Tectonostratigraphy
- Topostratigraphy
- Biozone
