= List of Guggenheim Fellowships awarded in 1969 =

Two hundred and seventy scholars, artists, and scientists received Guggenheim Fellowships in 1969. $2,214,500 was disbursed between the recipients, who were chosen from an applicant pool of 1,977. Of the 66 universities represented, University of California, Berkeley had the most winners on its faculty (24), with University of Wisconsin and Yale University tied for the second-highest number (13). Columbia University (12) was third.

== 1969 United States and Canadian Fellows ==
Category	Field of Study	Fellow	Institutional association	Research topic	Notes	Ref
Creative Arts	Choreography	Eliot Feld		Dance		
Creative Arts	Choreography	Pearl Lang	Pearl Lang Dance Theater	Dance	Also won in 1960	
Creative Arts	Choreography	Murray Louis	Murray Louis Dance Company	Dance	Also won in 1973	
Creative Arts	Choreography	Yvonne Rainer		A performance and a film	Also won in 1988	
Creative Arts	Drama and Performance Art	Terrence McNally			Also won in 1966	
Creative Arts	Fiction	William H. Gass	Purdue University	Writing		
Creative Arts	Fiction	Jorge Ibargüengoitia		Writing		
Creative Arts	Fiction	Cormac McCarthy		Writing	Also won in 1976	
Creative Arts	Fiction	James R. McConkey	Cornell University	Writing		
Creative Arts	Fiction	Thomas Rogers	Pennsylvania State University	Writing		
Creative Arts	Film	Scott Bartlett		Serpent (1971 short film)		
Creative Arts	Film	Will Hindle		Watersmith (film about the American Olympic swim team)		
Creative Arts	Film	Richard L. Myers	Kent State University		Also won in 1971	
Creative Arts	Film	Robert Nelson	San Francisco Art Institute			
Creative Arts	Fine Arts	Larry Bell		Sculpture		
Creative Arts	Fine Arts	Daniel J. Christensen		Painting		
Creative Arts	Fine Arts	Walter De Maria		Sculpture		
Creative Arts	Fine Arts	Herbert Ferber		Sculpture		
Creative Arts	Fine Arts	Tom S. Fricano	San Fernando Valley State College	Graphic arts		
Creative Arts	Fine Arts	Joseph Goto		Sculpture and drawing		
Creative Arts	Fine Arts	Walter S. H. Hamady	University of Wisconsin	Manual on the handmaking of paper		
Creative Arts	Fine Arts	Will Insley		Two and three dimension space diagrams		
Creative Arts	Fine Arts	Irene S. Kubota		Painting		
Creative Arts	Fine Arts	Alfred Leslie		Painting		
Creative Arts	Fine Arts	Robert P. Mangold	School of Visual Arts	Painting		
Creative Arts	Fine Arts	Robert E. Morris	Hunter College, CUNY			
Creative Arts	Fine Arts	John Opper	New York University	Painting		
Creative Arts	Fine Arts	Robert Andrew Parker		Graphics		
Creative Arts	Fine Arts	Robert C. Postma	Lehman College	Painting		
Creative Arts	Fine Arts	Alan Saret		Sculpture		
Creative Arts	Fine Arts	Myron S. Stout		Painting		
Creative Arts	Fine Arts	Robert O. Swain		Painting		
Creative Arts	Fine Arts	Romas Viesulas	Temple University	Graphics	Also won in 1958, 1964	
Creative Arts	Music Composition	Stephen Douglas Burton		One Does Not Toy with Love (opera)		
Creative Arts	Music Composition	John Edmunds		Composition		
Creative Arts	Music Composition	John Huggler	University of Massachusetts, Boston	Composition	Also won in 1962	
Creative Arts	Music Composition	Edwin London	Smith College	Composition		
Creative Arts	Music Composition	George Russell		Composition	Also won in 1972	
Creative Arts	Music Composition	Harvey Sollberger	Columbia University	Composition	Also won in 1973	
Creative Arts	Music Composition	George T. Walker	Smith College	Composition	Also won in 1987	
Creative Arts	Photography	Chauncey Hare		Photographic study of California interiors	Also won in 1971, 1976	
Creative Arts	Photography	Danny Lyon			Also won in 1978	
Creative Arts	Photography	Art Sinsabaugh	University of Illinois, Urbana			
Creative Arts	Photography	Garry Winogrand		Effect of media on events	Also won in 1964, 1978	
Creative Arts	Poetry	Michael Benedikt	Bennington College	Writing		
Creative Arts	Poetry	Edgar Bowers	Harpur College	Writing	Also won in 1958	
Creative Arts	Poetry	Jim Harrison		Writing		
Creative Arts	Poetry	Anne Sexton		Writing		
Humanities	African Studies	Raymond K. Kent	University of California, Berkeley	History of the Sakalava people of western Madagascar		
Humanities	American Literature	Sacvan Bercovitch	University of California, San Diego			
Humanities	American Literature	Ronald Gottesman	Indiana University			
Humanities	American Literature	Alfred Kazin	Stony Brook University		Also won in 1940, 1947, 1958	
Humanities	American Literature	James E. Miller Jr.	University of Chicago			
Humanities	Architecture, Planning and Design	Stanford Anderson	Massachusetts Institute of Technology			
Humanities	Architecture, Planning and Design	David J. Jacob	Kevin Roche John Dinkeloo and Associates	Relationships between space and structure		
Humanities	Architecture, Planning and Design	Richard Saul Wurman				
Humanities	Architecture, Planning and Design	Oscar Yujnovsky	Torcuato di Tella Institute			
Humanities	Bibliography	G. Thomas Tanselle	University of Wisconsin	Republishing firm of B. W. Huebsch, 1900-1925		
Humanities	British History	Lewis Perry Curtis Jr.	University of California, Berkeley	Devolution movement and the decline of the landlord class in Ireland		
Humanities	British History	James K. McConica	Pontifical Institute of Mediaeval Studies	History of Oxford University in the Tudor period		
Humanities	British History	Theodore K. Rabb	Princeton University	Biography of Sir Edwin Sandys		
Humanities	Classics	Erich S. Gruen	University of California, Berkeley	Politics in the last decades of the Roman Republic	Also won in 1989	
Humanities	Classics	Henry Schroder Robinson	American School of Classical Studies at Athens			
Humanities	East Asian Studies	Chih-tsing Hsia	Columbia University			
Humanities	East Asian Studies	Ivan Morris	Columbia University			
Humanities	East Asian Studies	W. Allyn Rickett	University of Pennsylvania			
Humanities	Economic History	Rondo Cameron	University of Wisconsin	History of 19th-century economic development	Also won in 1954	
Humanities	English Literature	Edward A. Bloom	Brown University	Neoclassical satire		
Humanities	English Literature	Marie Borroff	Yale University	20th-century poetry		
Humanities	English Literature	Stanley Fish	University of California, Berkeley	Relationship between style and epistemology in 17th century prose and poetry		
Humanities	English Literature	A. Bartlett Giamatti	Yale University	Impact of Italy and Italian Renaissance literature on 16th- and 17th-century English literature		
Humanities	English Literature	John H. Hagan	SUNY Binghamton	Study of Charles Dickens' fiction in relation to his journalism		
Humanities	English Literature	Arthur C. Kirsch	University of Virginia	Tragicomic patterns in Jacobean and Caroline drama		
Humanities	English Literature	Ulrich C. Knoepflmacher	University of California, Berkeley	Resemblances and differences between the Romantics and the Victorians	Also won in 1987	
Humanities	English Literature	John M. Robson	University of Toronto			
Humanities	English Literature	Alan Roper	University of California, Los Angeles			
Humanities	English Literature	Samuel Schoenbaum	Northwestern University	Critical history of Shakespeare biography	Also won in 1956	
Humanities	English Literature	Patricia M. Spacks	Wellesley College			
Humanities	English Literature	George A. Starr	University of California, Berkeley	Moral basis of the novels of Samuel Richardson		
Humanities	English Literature	John M. Wallace	University of Chicago	Critical edition of the works of Anthony Ascham		
Humanities	English Literature	Alexander Welsh	University of Pittsburgh	Thematic definition in the English novel		
Humanities	English Literature	Virgil Keeble Whitaker	Stanford University	Interpretation of the works of Francis Bacon		
Humanities	Fine Arts Research	Dore Ashton	School of Visual Arts	Modern art	Also won in 1963	
Humanities	Fine Arts Research	John Coplans	Pasadena Art Museum	Critical study of Ellsworth Kelly	Also won in 1985	
Humanities	Fine Arts Research	Edward A. Maser	University of Chicago	Franz Anton Maulbertsch		
Humanities	Folklore and Popular Culture	Robert A. Georges	University of California, Los Angeles	Research for his third book		
Humanities	Folklore and Popular Culture	Jerome R. Mintz	Indiana University			
Humanities	French History	Robert Forster	Johns Hopkins University	European bourgeoisie		
Humanities	French History	Robert M. Kingdon	University of Wisconsin	Reactions to the St. Bartholomew's Day massacre		
Humanities	French Literature	Anna Balakian	New York University			
Humanities	French Literature	Victor Brombert	Yale University	Prison imagery in Romantic literature	Also won in 1954	
Humanities	French Literature	Diane Giguère				
Humanities	French Literature	Fredric R. Jameson	University of California, San Diego		Also won in 1978	
Humanities	French Literature	Marcel Tetel	Duke University	Language and structure in Marguerite de Navarre's Heptaméron		
Humanities	General Nonfiction	Erik Barnouw	Columbia University			
Humanities	German and East European History	Gordon A. Craig	Stanford University	German and Austrian intelligentsias, 1770-1830	Also won in 1982	
Humanities	German and East European History	Fritz Stern	Columbia University			
Humanities	German and Scandinavian Literature	Joachim Birke	University of Chicago			
Humanities	German and Scandinavian Literature	Reinhold Grimm	University of Wisconsin	Critical reception of Bertolt Brecht since 1930		
Humanities	German and Scandinavian Literature	Antonín Hrubý	University of Washington			
Humanities	German and Scandinavian Literature	Ludwig W. Kahn	Columbia University			
Humanities	German and Scandinavian Literature	André von Gronicka	University of Pennsylvania		Also won in 1957	
Humanities	History of Science and Technology	David C. Kubrin	Dartmouth College	17th-century English cosmogony and the development of Newtonian physics		
Humanities	History of Science and Technology	Donald Bertram McIntyre	Pomona College	Help in the design of a computer system for the proposed international data bank		
Humanities	Linguistics	Dwight L. Bolinger	Harvard University			
Humanities	Linguistics	Ilse Lehiste	Ohio State University		Also won in 1975	
Humanities	Literary Criticism	Wayne C. Booth	University of Chicago		Also won in 1956	
Humanities	Literary Criticism	Seymour Chatman	University of California, Berkeley	Theory of style		
Humanities	Literary Criticism	Albert S. Cook Jr.	University at Buffalo	Greek tragedy		
Humanities	Literary Criticism	Geoffrey H. Hartman	Yale University	Transition of literary periods	Also won in 1986	
Humanities	Literary Criticism	Stanley Edgar Hyman	Bennington College	Critical study of Shakespeare's Iago		
Humanities	Literary Criticism	Robert W. Langbaum	University of Virginia	Mysteries of identity as a theme in 19th century literature		
Humanities	Medieval History	F. Donald Logan	Emmanuel College			
Humanities	Medieval Literature	Beverly M. Boyd	University of Kansas	Chaucer and the world of books		
Humanities	Medieval Literature	Donald R. Howard	Johns Hopkins University	Critical study of the Canterbury Tales	Also won in 1984	
Humanities	Medieval Literature	Peter Dale Scott	University of California, Berkeley	Ancient and medieval vision literature		
Humanities	Medieval Literature	Joseph Szövérffy	Boston College		Also won in 1961	
Humanities	Music Research	Barry S. Brook	Queens College, CUNY		Also won in 1960	
Humanities	Music Research	Richard L. Crocker	University of California, Berkeley	Early medieval sequence		
Humanities	Near Eastern Studies	Henry A. Fischel	Indiana University			
Humanities	Philosophy	Arthur C. Danto	Columbia University		Also won in 1982	
Humanities	Philosophy	Moltke Stefanus Gram	Northwestern University			
Humanities	Philosophy	Richard C. Jeffrey	University of Pennsylvania			
Humanities	Philosophy	Norman Dret Kretzmann	Cornell University	Philosophy of language in the Middle Ages		
Humanities	Philosophy	Richard H. Popkin	University of California, San Diego	History of skepticism		
Humanities	Philosophy	Josiah D. Thompson	Haverford College			
Humanities	Philosophy	Bas van Fraassen	Yale University	Language theory		
Humanities	Religion	Brian A. Gerrish	University of Chicago Divinity School	Life and thought of Ernst Troeltsch		
Humanities	Religion	Gordon D. Kaufman	Harvard University	Research at University of Oxford		
Humanities	Religion	Robert A. Kraft	University of Pennsylvania			
Humanities	Renaissance History	Sears R. Jayne	Hunter College	English poetry of the Renaissance	Also won in 1954	
Humanities	Russian History	Loren R. Graham	Massachusetts Institute of Technology			
Humanities	Russian History	Nicholas V. Riasanovsky	University of California, Berkeley	Comparative study of Russian and French intelligentsias in the first half of the 19th century		
Humanities	Russian History	Alfred E. Senn	University of Wisconsin	Anti-Tsarist Russian émigrés in Switzerland, 1914-1917		
Humanities	Russian History	Adam B. Ulam	Harvard University		Also won in 1956	
Humanities	Slavic Literature	Simon Karlinsky	University of California, Berkeley	History of Russian drama as literature	Also won in 1977	
Humanities	Slavic Literature	Robert A. Maguire	Columbia University			
Humanities	Spanish and Portuguese Literature	Arthur L.-F. Askins	University of California, Berkeley	Hispano-Portuguese poetry of the 16th century		
Humanities	Spanish and Portuguese Literature	Ricardo Gullón	University of Texas	Ideologies underlying Hispanic literary modernism		
Humanities	Spanish and Portuguese Literature	Gonzalo Sobejano	Columbia University			
Humanities	Theatre Arts	Bernard F. Dukore	City University of New York			
Humanities	Theatre Arts	A. C. Scott	University of Wisconsin	Historical study of the Indonesian theatre		
Humanities	Theatre Arts	Louis Sheaffer			Also won in 1959, 1962	
Humanities	United States History	Roger H. Brown	American University			
Humanities	United States History	Alain Clément				
Humanities	United States History	William W. Freehling	University of Michigan	History of the American South, 1850-1861		
Humanities	United States History	Gary B. Nash	University of California, Los Angeles			
Humanities	United States History	John Webb Pratt	Stony Brook University			
Humanities	United States History	John W. Shy	University of Michigan			
Humanities	United States History	Clark C. Spence	University of Illinois, Urbana			
Humanities	United States History	Stephan Thernstrom	Brandeis University			
Humanities	United States History	Russell F. Weigley	Temple University	History of American strategic thought		
Humanities	United States History	Alfred Fabian Young	Northern Illinois University	Urban Jeffersonians		
Natural Sciences	Applied Mathematics	Ivan Frisch	University of California, Berkeley	Theory of communication networks		
Natural Sciences	Applied Mathematics	Ralph Greif	University of California, Berkeley	Heat transfer in radiating flows		
Natural Sciences	Applied Mathematics	Fritz John	New York University		Also won in 1962	
Natural Sciences	Applied Mathematics	Daniel D. Joseph	University of Minnesota			
Natural Sciences	Applied Mathematics	Anthony E. Siegman	Stanford University	Quantum electronics		
Natural Sciences	Astronomy and Astrophysics	Edward A. Frieman	Princeton University			
Natural Sciences	Astronomy and Astrophysics	Martin Harwit	Cornell University	Infrared astronomy		
Natural Sciences	Astronomy and Astrophysics	George A. Seielstad	California Institute of Technology	Extragalactic radio astronomy		
Natural Sciences	Astronomy and Astrophysics	Thomas H. Stix	Princeton University			
Natural Sciences	Astronomy and Astrophysics	Alar Toomre	Massachusetts Institute of Technology			
Natural Sciences	Chemistry	John M. Alexander	Stony Brook University			
Natural Sciences	Chemistry	Joseph Cerny III	University of California, Berkeley	Nuclear chemistry		
Natural Sciences	Chemistry	Lawrence F. Dahl	University of Wisconsin	Experimental studies in inorganic chemistry		
Natural Sciences	Chemistry	Howard Ted Davis	University of Minnesota			
Natural Sciences	Chemistry	Robert Gomer	University of Chicago			
Natural Sciences	Chemistry	Eugene Helfand	Bell Telephone Laboratories			
Natural Sciences	Chemistry	David R. Kearns	University of California, Riverside	Quantum chemistry		
Natural Sciences	Chemistry	Larry Kevan	University of Kansas	Experimental studies in radiation chemistry		
Natural Sciences	Chemistry	James L. Kinsey	Massachusetts Institute of Technology			
Natural Sciences	Chemistry	Victor W. Laurie	Princeton University			
Natural Sciences	Chemistry	Franklin A. Long	Cornell University	Physical chemistry	Also won in 1956	
Natural Sciences	Chemistry	C. Bradley Moore	University of California, Berkeley	Molecular collision processes		
Natural Sciences	Chemistry	Edward V. Sayre	New York University	Research at Oxford University's Laboratory for Archaeometry and the History of Art		
Natural Sciences	Chemistry	John A. Schellman	University of Oregon	Protein structure		
Natural Sciences	Chemistry	Gabor A. Somorjai	University of California, Berkeley	Physical chemistry		
Natural Sciences	Chemistry	James H. Swinehart	University of California, Davis			
Natural Sciences	Chemistry	Robert E. Thach	Harvard University			
Natural Sciences	Computer Science	Michael A. Harrison	University of California, Berkeley	Theoretical studies in programming languages		
Natural Sciences	Computer Science	Thomas Kailath	Stanford University	Applications of the innovations concept in estimation and detection theory		
Natural Sciences	Earth Science	Alfred G. Fischer	Princeton University	Deep sea sediment		
Natural Sciences	Earth Science	Seymour O. Schlanger	University of California, Riverside	Limestones in the Swiss Alps to determine ancient climates in the region		
Natural Sciences	Earth Science	Brian J. Skinner	Yale University	Australian geological deposits		
Natural Sciences	Earth Science	Henry Stommel	Massachusetts Institute of Technology			
Natural Sciences	Earth Science	Lionel Edward Weiss	University of California, Berkeley	Structural geology	Also won in 1961	
Natural Sciences	Engineering	Sheldon K. Friedlander	California Institute of Technology	Development of urban atmosphere models for air resource management		
Natural Sciences	Engineering	L. E. Scriven	University of Minnesota			
Natural Sciences	Mathematics	Richard A. Askey	University of Wisconsin	Orthogonal polynomials		
Natural Sciences	Mathematics	Paul J. Cohen	Stanford University	Set theory		
Natural Sciences	Mathematics	Richard V. Kadison	University of Pennsylvania			
Natural Sciences	Medicine and Health	Robert B. Bradfield	University of California, Berkeley	Clinical nutrition		
Natural Sciences	Medicine and Health	Rubin Bressler	Duke University School of Medicine	Effects of pharmacologic agents on the metabolism of the pancreas and on insulin secretion		
Natural Sciences	Medicine and Health	Irwin M. Freedberg	Harvard Medical School	Research at the Weizmann Institute		
Natural Sciences	Medicine and Health	Marion E. Hodes	Indiana University Medical Center			
Natural Sciences	Medicine and Health	Per Fredrik Scholander	Scripps Institution of Oceanography			
Natural Sciences	Molecular and Cellular Biology	Eric A. Barnard	University at Buffalo	Biochemical evolution in chymotrypsins		
Natural Sciences	Molecular and Cellular Biology	Elmer L. Becker	Georgetown University	Research at Sir William Dunn School of Pathology		
Natural Sciences	Molecular and Cellular Biology	Jacob J. Blum	Duke University	Hydrodynamic interaction between adjacent cilia		
Natural Sciences	Molecular and Cellular Biology	John E. Casida	University of California, Berkeley	Aspects of the biotoxiology of insecticide chemicals		
Natural Sciences	Molecular and Cellular Biology	Bernard F. Erlanger	Columbia University			
Natural Sciences	Molecular and Cellular Biology	Lucille S. Hurley	University of California, Davis	Influence of nutritional factors during prenatal development and the interaction of nutrition and genetics at this time	Also won in 1962	
Natural Sciences	Molecular and Cellular Biology	Arthur Kornberg	Stanford University	Application of physical chemical techniques to problems of membrane structure		
Natural Sciences	Molecular and Cellular Biology	Edmund Chi Chien Lin	Harvard Medical School			
Natural Sciences	Molecular and Cellular Biology	Jack Preiss	University of California, Davis			
Natural Sciences	Molecular and Cellular Biology	Frank W. Putnam	Indiana University	Research at University of Cambridge		
Natural Sciences	Molecular and Cellular Biology	Gunther Siegmund Stent	University of California, Berkeley	History of molecular biology		
Natural Sciences	Organismic Biology and Ecology	Howard E. Evans	Harvard University		Also won in 1958	
Natural Sciences	Organismic Biology and Ecology	James R. King	Washington State University			
Natural Sciences	Plant Sciences	J. M. J. de Wet	University of Illinois, Urbana			
Natural Sciences	Plant Sciences	Norma J. Lang	University of California, Davis	Basic questions of cellular metabolism		
Natural Sciences	Plant Sciences	Richard E. Norris	University of Washington			
Natural Sciences	Plant Sciences	Peter H. Raven	Stanford University	Plant biosystematics and evolution		
Natural Sciences	Physics	Samuel M. Berman	Stanford Linear Accelerator Center	Elementary particle physics	Also won in 1977	
Natural Sciences	Physics	Charles K. Bockelman	Yale University	Nuclear physics		
Natural Sciences	Physics	Ralph Bray	Purdue University	Research at Oxford University and Technion		
Natural Sciences	Physics	Manuel Cardona	Brown University	Vacuum-UV optical properties of semiconductors		
Natural Sciences	Physics	Theodore G. Castner Jr.	University of Rochester	Solid state physics		
Natural Sciences	Physics	Alan Garen	Yale University			
Natural Sciences	Physics	Ivar Giaever	General Electric Research & Development Center	Biophysics		
Natural Sciences	Physics	Erwin L. Hahn	University of California, Berkeley	Concepts of pulsed coherent quantum phenomena	Also won in 1961	
Natural Sciences	Physics	Martin L. Perl	SLAC National Accelerator Laboratory	Elementary particle physics		
Natural Sciences	Physics	David Pines	University of Illinois, Urbana		Also won in 1962	
Natural Sciences	Physics	Norman S. Shiren	IBM Watson Research Center			
Natural Sciences	Physics	Roy Weinstein	Northeastern University			
Natural Sciences	Physics	Robert Lee White	Stanford University	Solid state physics	Also won in 1977	
Natural Sciences	Physics	Fredrik Zachariasen	California Institute of Technology	Elementary particle physics		
Natural Sciences	Statistics	C. Frederick Mosteller	Harvard University			
Social Sciences	Anthropology and Cultural Studies	Albert Damon	Harvard University			
Social Sciences	Anthropology and Cultural Studies	Hilda Kuper	University of California, Los Angeles			
Social Sciences	Anthropology and Cultural Studies	Alan Parkhurst Merriam	Indiana University			
Social Sciences	Anthropology and Cultural Studies	Frank T. Siebert Jr.		Penobscot dictionary		
Social Sciences	Anthropology and Cultural Studies	G. William Skinner	Stanford University	Local system in traditional China and their modern transformation		
Social Sciences	Economics	George R. Feiwel	University of Tennessee	Comparative study of economic revisionism in selected East European countries		
Social Sciences	Economics	Edward J. Kane	Boston College	Forecasting the long-range behavior of interest rates		
Social Sciences	Economics	Albert Rees	Princeton University			
Social Sciences	Economics	Joseph E. Stiglitz	Yale University	Economic analysis		
Social Sciences	Economics	Robert Triffin	Yale University	International monetary reform		
Social Sciences	Economics	Burton A. Weisbrod	University of Wisconsin	Theory of the nonprofit sector of the economy		
Social Sciences	Education	Elliot W. Eisner	Stanford University	Theoretical studies in curriculum development and art education		
Social Sciences	Education	W. Lee Hansen	University of Wisconsin	Economic and social determinants of the demand for education in American society		
Social Sciences	Education	Luther Harmon Zeigler	University of Oregon			
Social Sciences	Geography and Environmental Studies	Edward T. Price	University of Oregon	Historical study of courthouse squares in the eastern United States		
Social Sciences	Geography and Environmental Studies	John Henry Warkentin	York University			
Social Sciences	Law	Harry D. Krause	University of Illinois, Urbana			
Social Sciences	Law	Donald T. Trautman	Harvard University			
Social Sciences	Political Science	Kenneth M. Dolbeare	University of Wisconsin	Citizen participation in public policy implementation		
Social Sciences	Political Science	Joseph Hamburger	Yale University	19th-century political thought	Also won in 1965	
Social Sciences	Political Science	Wladyslaw W. Kulski	Duke University	Current Soviet foreign policy	Also won in 1961	
Social Sciences	Political Science	Gerhard Loewenberg	Mount Holyoke College			
Social Sciences	Political Science	Douglas W. Rae	Yale University	Theory of political constitutions		
Social Sciences	Political Science	Bruce M. Russett	Yale University	International politics		
Social Sciences	Political Science	Frank J. Sorauf	University of Minnesota			
Social Sciences	Psychology	Margaret Brenman Gibson	Austen Riggs Center	Psychoanalytic study of the creative individual		
Social Sciences	Psychology	Murray Glanzer	New York University	Research at the Hebrew University		
Social Sciences	Psychology	Richard S. Lazarus	University of California, Berkeley	Theoretical studies of the psycho-physiology of stress		
Social Sciences	Psychology	Herbert S. Terrace	Columbia University			
Social Sciences	Psychology	Bernard Weiner	University of California, Los Angeles			
Social Sciences	Psychology	Harry A. Wilmer	University of California Medical Center	Book about his experience running an adolescent ward for patients involved with drug use		
Social Sciences	Sociology	Robert M. Marsh	Brown University			
Social Sciences	Sociology	Philip Rieff	University of Pennsylvania	Theory of culture		
Social Sciences	Sociology	Patricia Cayo Sexton	New York University			
Social Sciences	Sociology	Melvin M. Tumin	Princeton University			

== 1969 Latin American and Caribbean Fellows ==
Category	Field of Study	Fellow	Institutional association	Research topic	Notes	Ref
Creative Arts	Fiction	Juan José Hernández		La ciudad de los sueños (published 1971)		
Creative Arts	Fine Arts	Amílcar de Castro		Sculpture	Also won in 1967	
Creative Arts	Fine Arts	Jorge Dubon Cruz			Also won in 1964, 1979	
Creative Arts	Fine Arts	Alberto Gironella		Painting		
Creative Arts	Music Composition	Leni Alexander		Composition		
Creative Arts	Music Composition	Alberto Evaristo Ginastera		Composition	Also won in 1942, 1946	
Creative Arts	Music Composition	Julián Orbón de Soto		Composition	Also won in 1958	
Creative Arts	Poetry	José Carlos Becerra		Writing		
Creative Arts	Poetry	Carlos Germán Belli	National University of San Marcos		Also won in 1987	
Humanities	Fine Arts Research	Damián Carlos Bayón	French National Centre for Scientific Research			
Humanities	Latin American Literature	Benedito Nunes	University of Rennes			
Humanities	Medieval History	José Luis Romero			Also won in 1951	
Humanities	Spanish and Portuguese Literature	Margit Frenk Alatorre	Colegio de México			
Humanities	Theatre Arts	Alfredo Rodriguez Arias				
Natural Sciences	Astronomy and Astrophysics	Alejandro Feinstein	Universidad Nacional de La Plata	Research at Steward Observatory		
Natural Sciences	Earth Science	Alfredo Bolsi	National University of Tucumán	Research with Jacqueline Beaujeu-Garnier and Carl Sauer		
Natural Sciences	Earth Science	Rubens da Silva Santos	National Department of Mineral Production			
Natural Sciences	Mathematics	Ezio Marchi	National University of Cuyo	Research at the University of New Mexico		
Natural Sciences	Medicine and Health	José Perea-Sasiaín	National University of Colombia			
Natural Sciences	Molecular and Cellular Biology	Jorge Aceves	Instituto Politécnico Nacional			
Natural Sciences	Molecular and Cellular Biology	Danko Brncic	University of Chile		Also won in 1951	
Natural Sciences	Molecular and Cellular Biology	Jaime F. George	Pontificia Universidad Javeriana	Biochemicals and proteins in Colombian frogs		
Natural Sciences	Organismic Biology and Ecology	Carlos S. Carbonell	University of the Republic	Study and photographing of Orthoptera		
Natural Sciences	Plant Sciences	Luis R. Almodóvar	University of Puerto Rico			
Natural Sciences	Plant Sciences	John Arnott Spence	University of the West Indies			
Social Sciences	Anthropology and Cultural Studies	Victoria de la Jara	National Museum of Archaeology, Anthropology and History of Peru			
Social Sciences	Anthropology and Cultural Studies	Miguel León-Portilla	National Autonomous University of Mexico			
Social Sciences	Sociology	Roberto Juan Llaryora	University of Heidelberg			

== See also ==
- Guggenheim Fellowship
- List of Guggenheim Fellowships awarded in 1968
- List of Guggenheim Fellowships awarded in 1970
