= Heidi Schellman =

American physicist

Heidi Marie Schellman
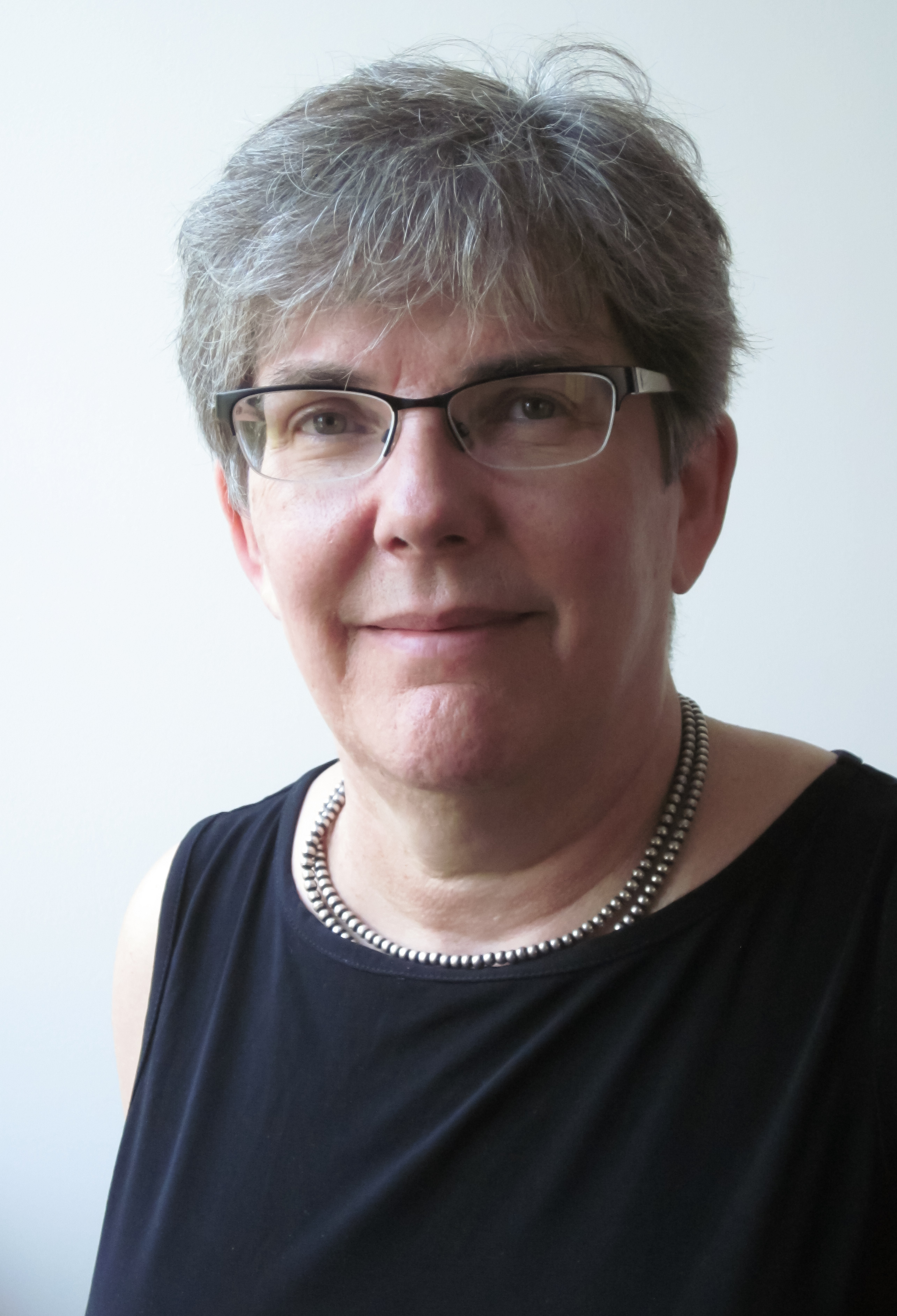
- Heidi Schellman, Head of Physics Department, Oregon State University
- Born: 1957 (age 68–69); Hennepin, Minnesota
- Education: University of California, Berkeley
- Scientific career
- Thesis: Inclusive production of strange and vector mesons in e+ e- annihilation at 29-GeV (1984)
- Doctoral advisor: George H. Trilling

Heidi Marie Schellman (born 1957) is an American particle physicist at Oregon State University (OSU), where she heads the Department of Physics. She is an expert in Quantum chromodynamics and a member of the United States National Academy of Sciences.

== Early life and education ==
Schellman was born in 1957 in Hennepin, Minnesota, the daughter of two chemists. Her father, John Anthony Schellman, who trained at Princeton, was a professor of chemistry and biochemistry at the University of Oregon; he was an early member of the "groundbreaking Institute of Molecular Biology" and a member of the National Academy of Sciences. Her mother, F. Charlotte Green, held a Ph.D. in chemistry from Stanford and had also worked at the California Institute of Technology. They married in 1954 while they were both postdoctoral fellows at the Carlsberg Laboratory in Copenhagen, Denmark. At the University of Oregon, both her parents "were known for advancing the study of protein structure, folding and stability through techniques such as circular dichroism spectroscopy".

Heidi Schellman graduated from South Eugene High School in Eugene, Oregon, in 1975. She earned a B.S. in mathematics in 1977 from Stanford University and an M.S. and Ph.D. in physics by 1984 from the University of California, Berkeley.

Schellman married physicist Stephen A. Wolbers in 1983.

== Career and research ==
Schellman began her career as a programmer at the Stanford Linear Accelerator (SLAC), where she learned "she liked the mixture of theory and practice in experimental physics. She describes her love of physics succinctly: 'Physicists get to build things!' ".

Prior to joining the OSU faculty in 2015, she held postdoctoral fellowships at the University of Chicago and Fermilab, and was on the faculty of Northwestern University, where she was chair of the physics and astronomy programs at the Weinberg College of Arts and Sciences.

In 2015, Schellman was elected vice chair of the Commission on Particles and Fields within the International Union of Pure and Applied Physics.

Schellman's research interests include, "future high-intensity neutrino experiments and the relation between cosmology and high-energy physics". She has collaborated on D-Zero and Tevatron experiments at Fermilab, researching the mass of top quarks and interactions of protons and anti-protons, and has extensively studied quantum chromodynamics perturbation theory.

Schellman works as a developer for the Deep Underground Neutrino Experiment (DUNE).

Schellman also teaches physics at the Oregon State University.

== Honors ==
Schellman was an A.P. Sloan Research Fellow and a Department of Energy Outstanding Junior Investigator. She was elected a Fellow of the American Physical Society in 1999, cited for "her leadership in QCD physics and as spokesperson of E-665, the Tevatron muon scattering experiment". She was awarded the 2015 Mentoring Award by the American Physical Society’s Division of Particles and Fields. She was elected a member of the United States National Academy of Sciences in 2025.

== Athletic Accomplishments ==
Schellman won the Bay-to-Breakers 10K in 1983 in the Centipede Category as part of the Accelepede. She won the 1976 team Stanford Intramurals for the champion Junipero Ringers Association.
