= The House of the Seven Gables (film) =

1940 film by Joe May

- Directed by: Joe May
- Screenplay by: Lester Cole
- Based on: The House of the Seven Gables by Nathaniel Hawthorne
- Starring: George Sanders; Margaret Lindsay; Vincent Price
- Cinematography: Milton R. Krasner
- Edited by: Frank Gross
- Music by: Frank Skinner
- Production company: Universal Pictures Co.
- Distributed by: Universal Pictures Co.
- Release dates: February 29, 1940 (Chicago, Illinois); April 12, 1940 (United States)
- Running time: 89 minutes
- Country: United States
- Language: English
- Box office: $161,625

The House of the Seven Gables is a 1940 Gothic drama film based on the 1851 novel of the same name by Nathaniel Hawthorne. It stars George Sanders, Margaret Lindsay, and Vincent Price, and tells the story of a family consumed by greed in which one brother frames another for murder. It is a remake of the 1910 film of the same name, which starred Mary Fuller. The film's musical score was nominated for the Oscar for Best Original Score. The plot of the film differs dramatically from that of Hawthorne's novel.

== Plot ==
Colonel Jaffrey Pyncheon falsely accused a poor carpenter, Matthew Maule, of witchcraft during the Salem witch trials. Maule was hanged. Pyncheon took his land and built the luxurious Pyncheon home on it. But Maule cursed the Pyncheons, and the colonel soon died. The family has lived during the next 160 years desperately afraid of the "Maule curse".

In the mid-19th century, Col. Pyncheon's great-great-grandson Jaffrey Pyncheon (George Sanders) is a lawyer just embarking on his career. His elder brother, Clifford (Vincent Price), lives at home with their father, Gerald Pyncheon (Gilbert Emery). Jaffrey is obsessed with legends that say a vast sum of money is hidden in the Pyncheon house. Jaffrey is summoned to his father's home when Clifford informs him that the house is to be sold to pay his father's debts. Jaffrey, terrified at losing the lost treasure, pries up floorboards and searches in the walls at night for the lost gold. Clifford, however, doesn't believe the family stories. He wants to marry his cousin, Hepzibah Pyncheon (Margaret Lindsay), sell the house, and move to New York City.

When Gerald decides not to sell the house after all, Clifford and his father argue violently. Gerald dies of a heart attack, and strikes his head as he falls. Jaffrey, knowing Clifford is innocent, nonetheless accuses him of murder. Clifford is convicted and imprisoned, but renews "Maule's curse" upon Jaffrey before being led away. Gerald's will gives all three children sizeable yearly incomes, but leaves the house to Hepzibah. Hepzibah throws Jaffrey out of the house and seals all the doors and windows so that no light can be admitted. Over the next two decades, she rarely leaves her home.

In 1841, Clifford is given a new cellmate, who identifies himself as Matthew Maule (Dick Foran). He and Clifford become close friends. Maule is shortly released, and takes the name "Holgrave." An abolitionist, he rents a room from Hepzibah Pyncheon. Shortly thereafter, a distant cousin dies and Hepzibah takes in the cousin's daughter, Phoebe Pyncheon (Nan Grey). Desperate for money, Hepzibah opens a small shop in a room of her home. With the beautiful, vivacious Phoebe running the shop, it is a success and earns her much money.

After years of Hepzibah trying, the governor finally releases Clifford from prison, whereupon he returns to the Pyncheon house. "Holgrave" spreads rumors about town that Clifford has been poring over old documents, has found a secret stairway in the house, and is tearing up the Pyncheon home in search of the long-lost treasure. Jaffrey has invested money from wealthy abolitionists in risky investments involving the slave trade. Realizing he might be able to seize control of the house, Jaffrey uses these rumors to accuse Clifford of insanity. Jaffrey visits the house, and hears banging – which he assumes is Clifford searching for the gold. Jaffrey leaves, triumphant. Hepzibah discovers that Holgrave is making these noises, and evicts him from the house despite the protests of Phoebe (who is in love with him). A worried Hepzibah then searches Holgrave's room and discovers he is really Matthew Maule. She warns Clifford, who admits that he has known all along who Holgrave is and that Holgrave is part of his plan to clear his name.

Jaffrey visits the house and tells Clifford that he intends to have him committed. Clifford responds by asking Jaffrey to sign a document that clears Clifford's name. Jaffrey refuses. Deacon Arnold Foster (Miles Mander), who loaned Jaffrey the investment funds, arrives and demands the money back. Jaffrey refuses. The deacon goes into the hallway and commits suicide. Hepzibah accuses Jaffrey of murder. Panicking, Jaffrey signs the document and tells Clifford that he can have the lost treasure so long as Clifford does not accuse him of murder. Clifford admits that there is no hidden staircase and no gold. It's all been a trick on Jaffrey, played by Clifford and Matthew Maule.

Hearing the name of Maule, Jaffrey collapses dead. With Clifford's name cleared, he marries Hepzibah and Maule marries Phoebe. They restore the house, and put it up for sale.

== Cast ==
- George Sanders as Jaffrey Pyncheon
- Margaret Lindsay as Hepzibah Pyncheon
- Vincent Price as Clifford Pyncheon
- Dick Foran as Matthew Holgrave
- Nan Grey as Phoebe Pyncheon
- Cecil Kellaway as Philip Barton
- Alan Napier as Fuller
- Gilbert Emery as Gerald Pyncheon
- Miles Mander as Deacon Arnold Foster
- Charles Trowbridge as Judge
- Harry Cording as Blacksmith Hawkins (uncredited)
- Murdock MacQuarrie as Town Gossip (uncredited)

== Production ==
The House of the Seven Gables was first filmed by Edison Studios in 1910. This version, which is now lost, starred Mary Fuller. Republic Pictures announced a remake in 1935, but it went into development hell and was never made.

=== Producer and script writing ===
Universal Studios began planning its remake of The House of the Seven Gables probably in early 1939. Pre-production for the film was secretive, as the studio feared that other companies with more financial resources might rush a House of Seven Gables into production before Universal could finish its version. The studio wanted the picture to be a low-budget B film, which would be released as a double feature with another B film. It was budgeted at a low $152,625 ($3,532,648 in 2025 dollars), but was still considered one of Universal's "prestige" horror films. (Note: In contrast a major motion picture at Universal was often budgeted at anywhere from $850,000 to $1.1 million.)

Screenwriter Lester Cole says it was unclear why Universal chose to make the film, although it may have been because the book was in the public domain. (Note: Cole also suggests that the studio wanted the picture as a vehicle for Vincent Price, who had recently made a widely praised appearance in the Burt Kelly produced and Lester Cole written The Invisible Man Returns. But since Price was not initially cast in The House of the Seven Gables, Cole's surmise seems unlikely.) Film historian Don G. Smith, however, argues for an economic reason: Horror films were popular again. A national outcry against the gruesomeness of the 1935 film The Raven had convinced Universal Studios executives to place a ban on the production of horror films at the studio. But a New York City movie theater ran a triple-bill of Dracula, Frankenstein, and Son of Kong in 1938, and ticket sales were so strong that the theater ran the films 21 hours a day. Universal swiftly lifted its ban, and began production on a series of horror pictures: Son of Frankenstein, Sherlock Holmes and the House of Fear (aka The House of Fear), Black Friday, The Invisible Man Returns, The Mummy's Hand, The Invisible Woman, and The House of the Seven Gables.

Universal announced it would begin work on The House of the Seven Gables on October 10, 1939. The studio assigned one of its B-picture producers, Burt Kelly, to oversee the production. Kelly had an extensive background in theater, and had held a number of associate producer and producer positions at various studios. Universal also assigned one of its young staff writers, Harold Greene, to produce a treatment of the novel. Kelly had his choice of whom to hire as screenwriter, however, and he chose Lester Cole. Kelly had worked with Cole on a number of films, and film historian Bob Herzberg suggests that Kelly held progressive views which were shared by Cole (who openly held communist political views). Kelly, who Cole felt had "a real feeling for film and decent human instincts", was also a loyal friend of Cole's. Universal Studios initially balked at Kelly's decision because Cole's salary was $600 a week ($13,888 in 2025 dollars), but Kelly insisted and the studio gave in.

The lengthy novel by Nathaniel Hawthorne needed extensive cutting to turn it into a filmable script. Cole substantially cut much of the beginning of the novel, and altered a good deal of the plot—remaining faithful to the spirit of the novel if not its actual narrative. But Cole did more than adapt the novel. He purposefully injected extensive left-wing political views into the script. He turned the character of Matthew Maule/"Holgrave" into an abolitionist, and depicted capitalists like Jaffrey Pyncheon and Arnold Foster as illegal slave-traders. He also greatly sharpened Hawthorne's critique of materialism, and depicted the punishment for greed coming not from God (as Hawthorne did) but from moral and freedom-loving people. Film historian Lawrence Raw has argued that Cole, and to a lesser extent Greene, also wanted the story to attack authoritarianism. Cole in particular was deeply aware of the wave of fascism and dictatorship sweeping across Europe in the 1930s, and Raw argues that Cole transformed the film into a "propaganda piece" in which Jaffrey Pyncheon was a metaphor for governmental tyranny. Film historian and literary critic Thomas S. Hischak has argued that the final script ended up less about the novel and more about "variations on a theme by Hawthorne".

=== Production and casting ===
The film's low budget meant only modest production values. Nevertheless, production designer Jack Otterson went to Salem, Massachusetts, to take photographs and measurements of the Turner-Ingersoll Mansion (the inspiration for the House of the Seven Gables in Hawthorne's novel). A facade of the House of the Seven Gables was constructed on the Colonial Street backlot at Universal Studios (it remained standing into the 21st century). Interiors took up three soundstages at Universal Studios, with the primary sets representing the Seven Gables living room, lower hallway, and upper hallway. Props included more than 500 pieces of authentic early American tableware, kitchen pots, and kitchen utensils. Jack Pierce, makeup artist famous for his work in Universal's horror movies of the 1930s, came up with the makeup design for the lead performers (who age two decades or more during the course of the picture).

Universal Studios tested Margaret Lindsay for the role of Hepzibah Pyncheon on December 27, 1939. (Note: The studio apparently liked Lindsay's performance in the picture that it gave her a five-year contract in March 1940.) Robert Cummings was originally cast as Clifford Pyncheon about December 28, but he fell ill the following day and was forced to leave the production. (Note: Given the tight production schedule, the studio appears to have decided not to wait for Cummings to recover. Cummings was not assigned to a picture until January 22, 1940, indicating that he may have been ill for up to a month.) Price was cast most likely because he had forged a good working relationship with Kelly and May in October 1939 while working on The Invisible Man Returns. The studio announced Price's and Lindsay's casting, along with those of Nan Grey and George Sanders, on December 29. Studio publicists noted that the role of Matthew Maule remained unfilled.

The Los Angeles Times reported that principal photography was to have begun about December 24, but cameras did not begin rolling until December 29, 1939. The production shut down the same day due to casting problems and set construction delays. One of the problems was the height of the lead actors: Studio carpenters made the set for the average actor's height of 5 feet 9 inches (175 cm), but Price (6 feet 4 inches (193 cm)) and Sanders (6 feet 2 inches (188 cm)) were too tall. Doorway lintels and ceilings were quickly raised. Shooting resumed on January 3. The production was already three days behind schedule on January 5 due to problems with the period costumes, lighting, and the time-consuming aging makeup, and rain had delayed exterior shooting at the Seven Gables House.

Additional casting decisions were announced on January 4. Alan Napier, who had forged a deep friendship with Joe May on The Invisible Man Returns as well, was cast as the postman, Fuller. Dick Foran was cast as Matthew Maule and Gilbert Emery as Gerald Pyncheon that same day. Hiring for the major roles was not resolved until January 12, 1940, when the studio announced the casting of Cecil Kellaway and Charles Trowbridge. The following day, Universal announced that a song, "The Color of Your Eyes" (music and lyrics by Ralph Freed and Frank Skinner), had been added to the picture, and would be sung by Vincent Price. Additional delays occurred when airplanes flying over the set disrupted more exterior filming in mid January. Universal now began to put pressure on director Joe May to speed up the production. May did so, and by January 24 Trowbridge had finished all his scenes and had moved on to his next picture. The same day, Miles Mander was cast in the role of Arnold Foster. By working into the night (ten times between January 12 and the end of principal photography, the production did not break until 10 o'clock in the evening) the production was able to end in late January after 23 days of shooting (just two days over budget).

The film's final cost was $161,625.

=== Directing and acting ===
Joe May was hired as director because he'd helmed a series of Universal horror films in 1939, all of which had done well at the box office. May's background significantly influenced the film. He had fled his native Austria in 1934 due to the rise of Austrofascism, and became a contract director at Universal. May saw The House of the Seven Gables as a metaphor for opposing fascism and celebrating freedom of thought. But his background influenced the film in other ways, too. Alan Napier and Vincent Price both said that May had a heavy German accent, and had difficulty making himself understood in English. This hampered May's ability to direct his actors, and the studio ordered screenwriter Lester Cole to act as dialogue director.

Coming out of the German and Austrian film tradition, May was well versed in German Expressionism, and he introduced visual elements of this genre to the film. In one example, when Hepzibah descends the staircase, she casts a stark shadow against the wall. This is a visual doppelgänger, indicating that the character has two aspects which will be revealed in the film (the happy, youthful girl and the bitter, repressed spinster). May also used mise-en-scène, such as window panes or shadows, to show that the characters are trapped by Seven Gables or by circumstance.

George Sanders, a notoriously quick-witted individual with a cruel streak, did not get along with director Joe May, and Sanders ridiculed him openly. Alan Napier also said he had a poor on-set relationship with Sanders, who vociferously disliked Napier's good friend Anne Froelick. Film historians Tom Weaver, Michael Brunas, and John Brunas alleged that Price and Sanders also feuded on the set. But Price himself denied that he had a poor relationship with Sanders. Price later wrote that Sanders was "a dear and wonderful man. I knew him really intimately, and was very, very fond of him. He only pretended to be a dreadful man".

== Premieres and reception ==
=== Premieres ===
The House of the Seven Gables premiered in Chicago, Illinois, on February 29, 1940, along with Black Friday. Vincent Price and Bela Lugosi, stars of the respective films, were in attendance. (Note: Black Friday began principal photography on December 28, 1939, about the same time as The House of the Seven Gables. The similar production schedules may be why they were paired in release.) The film went into general release on April 12, 1940, the same day it made its New York City premiere.

=== Reception ===
The film was released to generally good reviews in the press. Lester Cole felt the script was one of the best he ever wrote, and later said that few reviewers made note of the extensive plot revisions he had made. Price and Sanders, both relative unknowns at the time, delivered good performances which boosted their careers significantly. Film historian Thomas S. Hischak said Margaret Lindsay was also very good as Hepzibah Pyncheon. Composer Frank Skinner received a nomination for the Academy Award for Best Original Score.

The film's reputation suffered in the 1950s. During the Second Red Scare of 1947 to 1957, Universal Studio executives criticized the film because, they said, Kelly and Cole had injected radical politics into the script and the directing.

Modern critics give mixed reviews to the picture. Vincent Price biographer Denis Meikle has called the film "overly sentimental", and criticized the aging make-up as not very good. He thought the movie was suspenseful, but also typical of the "mild" and "inoffensive" period pictures of the era.

== Price remake ==
The novel The House of the Seven Gables served as the basis of one of three stories in the 1963 anthology horror film Twice-Told Tales. The story, which departs significantly from both the book and the 1940 film, has Vincent Price portraying "Gerald Pyncheon" (a composite character)—a murderer who meets a supernatural end.

== Bibliography ==
- Booker, M. Keith (1991). Film and the American Left: A Research Guide. Westport, Conn.: Greenwood Press. ISBN 9780313309809.
- Cole, Lester (1981). Hollywood Red: The Autobiography of Lester Cole. Palo Alto, Calif.: Ramparts Publishing. ISBN 9780878670857.
- Dick, Barnard F. (1990). Anatomy of Film. New York: St. Martin's Press. ISBN 9780312019914.
- Eisner, Joel (2013). The Price of Fear: The Film Career of Vincent Price in His Own Words. Antelope, Callif.: Black Bed Sheet Books. ISBN 9780988659025.
- Gordon, Bernard (1999). Hollywood Exile, or, How I Learned to Love the Blacklist: A Memoir. Austin, Tex.: University of Texas Press. ISBN 9780292756403.
- Herzberg, Bob (2011). The Left Side of the Screen: Communist and Left-Wing Ideology in Hollywood, 1929-2009. Jefferson, N.C.: McFarland & Co. ISBN 9780786444564.
- Hischak, Thomas S. (2012). American Literature on Stage and Screen: 525 Works and Their Adaptations. Jefferson, N.C.: McFarland & Company. ISBN 9780786492794.
- Kinn, Gail; Piazza, Jim (2014). The Academy Awards: The Complete Unofficial History. New York: Black Dog & Leventhal Publishers. ISBN 9781579129866.
- Krutnik, Frank (2008). "Un-American" Hollywood: Politics and Film in the Blacklist Era. New Brunswick, N.J.: Rutgers University Press. ISBN 9780813541976.
- Meikle, Denis (2003). Vincent Price: The Art of Fear. London: Reynolds & Hearn. ISBN 9781903111536.
- Napier, Alan; Bigwood, James (2015). Not Just Batman's Butler: The Autobiography of Alan Napier. Jefferson, N.C.: Mcfarland & Co. ISBN 9781476662879.
- Parish, James Robert; Whitney, Steven (1974). Vincent Price Unmasked. New York: Darke Publishing. ISBN 9780877496670.
- Price, Victoria (1999). Vincent Price: A Daughter's Biography. New York: St. Martin's Press. ISBN 9780312242732.
- Raw, Lawrence (2008). Adapting Nathaniel Hawthorne to the Screen: Forging New Worlds. Lanham, Md.: Scarecrow Press. ISBN 9780810860490.
- Sandler, Corey (2006). Disneyland Resort, Universal Studios Hollywood, and Other Major Southern California Attractions Including Disney's California Adventure. Guilford, Conn.: Globe Pequot. ISBN 9780762738724.
- Senn, Bryan (2006). Golden Horrors: An Illustrated Critical Filmography of Terror Cinema, 1931-1939. Jefferson, N.C.: McFarland & Co. ISBN 9780786427246.
- Smith, Don G. (1996). Lon Chaney, Jr.: Horror Film Star, 1906-1973. Jefferson, N.C.: McFarland & Co. ISBN 9780786401208.
- Weaver, Tom; Brunas, Michael; Brunas, John (2007). Universal Horrors: The Studio's Classic Films, 1931-1946. Jefferson, N.C.: Mcfarland & Co. ISBN 9780786491506.
