= Ulrich C. Knoepflmacher =

American literary scholar and critic (1931–2026)

Ulrich Camillus Knoepflmacher (June 26, 1931 – September 4, 2026) was a German-born American literary scholar. He was the William and Annie S. Paton Foundation Professor of Ancient and Modern Literature, emeritus, and Professor of English, emeritus, Princeton University where he taught from 1979 to 2006. A specialist in Victorian literature and in childhood studies, he was recognized for his influential role in helping to establish children's literature as a legitimate field of scholarly inquiry. He was a member of the Modern Language Association and The Kipling Society. His work spanned Romantic and Victorian poetry, the English novel, and British and American children's books.

== Background ==
Knoepflmacher was born in Munich, Germany, on June 26, 1931, to Austrian-Jewish parents, Georg Knoepflmacher and Hilde Weiss. The family left Munich for Vienna in 1933 following the rise of Nazism, and emigrated from Europe in 1939, traveling through the Netherlands and Belgium before sailing from Antwerp to South America aboard the S.S. Aconcagua.

They settled in Oruro, Bolivia, where Knoepflmacher was educated at the Anglo-American School. In 1950, he moved to the United States and in 1951 enrolled at the University of California, Berkeley. After initially earning a B.A. in architecture, he changed his focus to English literature for his M.A. there, eventually earning his Ph.D. in English at Princeton University. He obtained United States Citizenship in 1963.

Knoepflmacher died on September 4, 2026, at the age of 95.

== Academic career ==
Knoepflmacher began his teaching career at the University of California, Berkeley, before joining the faculty of the English Department at Princeton University in 1979 where later he was named the William and Annie S. Paton Foundation Professor of Ancient and Modern Literature. His scholarly interests included Victorian fiction and poetry, gender studies, and the cultural representation of children.

He was among the first faculty members in the United States to teach undergraduate courses dedicated to children's literature. His efforts helped to legitimize the field within the academy and influenced the formation of children's literature programs at multiple institutions. Other courses he taught included The Victorian Novel, Victorian Poetry, and Judaism and Literary Culture. Knoepflmacher also conducted NEH-sponsored summer seminars for college teachers and for school teachers. He instructed teachers at the Bread Loaf School of English, Vermont (1981–1987) and through the New Jersey Teachers as Scholars program at Princeton. Over his distinguished career Knoepflmacher served on the editorial boards of the University of California Press and of scholarly journals: PMLA, Nineteenth-Century Literature; S.E.L.: Studies in English Literature; Victorian Literature and Culture.

== Legacy ==
Knoepflmacher is widely credited with his scholarship on the Victorian period and with transforming the academic study of children's literature. His interdisciplinary approach combined close literary analysis with historical, biographical, and cultural frameworks. He is also known for his mentorship of emerging scholars and for encouraging formal literary analysis to genres previously marginalized in literary studies, such as fairy tales and fantasy literature.

== Awards and honors ==
- American Council of Learned Societies Fellowship (1965)
- Humanities Research Fellowships, University of California, Berkeley (1966–67; 1977)
- Guggenheim Fellowships (1969, 1983)
- NEH Fellowships and Seminar Grants (1972, 1975, 1983, 1985, 1988, 1989, 1990, 1991, 1994, and 1998)
- Rockefeller Foundation Fellowship (1983)
- National Humanities Center Fellowship (1995)
- Howard T. Behrman Award for Distinguished Achievement in the Humanities, Princeton University (2007)
- Anne Devereaux Jordan Award, Children's Literature Association – for lifetime contributions to the field (2007)

== Selected publications ==
Books:

- Religious Humanism and the Victorian Novel. Princeton University Press, 1965; reprint ed. 2015.
- George Eliot's Early Novels: The Limits of Realism. University of California Press, 1968; reprint ed. 2019.
- Laughter and Despair: Readings in Ten Novels of the Victorian Era. University of California Press, 1971.
- 'Wuthering Heights': A Study. Ohio University Press, 1994.
- Ventures into Childland: Victorians, Fairy Tales, and Femininity. University of Chicago Press, 1998.
- Victorians Reading the Romantics: Essays by U.C. Knoepflmacher. Edited by Linda M. Shires. Ohio State University Press, 2016.

Co-Edited Essay Volumes:

- With G. B. Tennyson, Nature and the Victorian Imagination. University of California Press, 1977.
- With George Levine, The Endurance of 'Frankenstein': Essays on Mary Shelley's Novel. University of California Press, 1982.
- With Nina Auerbach, Forbidden Journeys: Fairy Tales and Fantasies by Victorian Women Writers. University of Chicago Press, 1992.
- With Logan D. Browning, Victorian Hybridities: Cultural Anxiety and Formal Innovation. Johns Hopkins University Press, 2010.

Edited Editions:

- George MacDonald, The Complete Fairy Tales. Ed. U.C. Knoepflmacher. Penguin, 1999.
- Frances Hodgson Burnett, A Little Princess. Ed. U.C. Knoepflmacher. Penguin, 2002.
