= The House of the Seven Gables =

1851 novel by Nathaniel Hawthorne

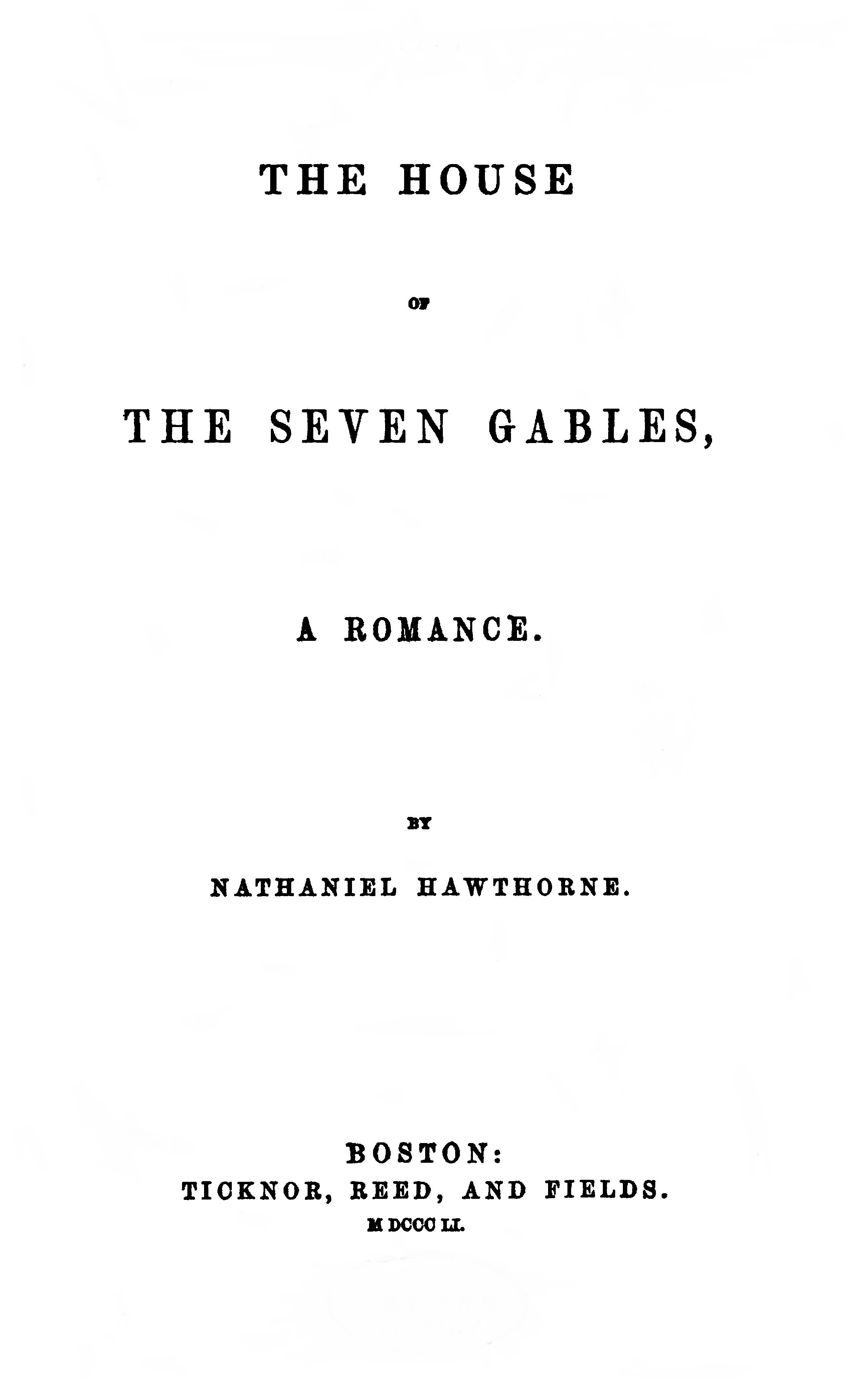
- First edition title page.
- Author: Nathaniel Hawthorne
- Language: English
- Genre: Gothic fiction; Romance
- Set in: mid-19th century, New England
- Publisher: Ticknor and Fields
- Publication date: April 9th, 1851
- Publication place: United States
- Media type: Print (Hardback)
- Pages: 344
- OCLC: 1374153
- Dewey Decimal: 813.3
- Text: The House of the Seven Gables at Wikisource

The House of the Seven Gables: A Romance is a Gothic novel written beginning in mid-1850 by American author Nathaniel Hawthorne and published in April 1851 by Ticknor and Fields of Boston. The novel follows a New England family and their ancestral home. In the book, Hawthorne explores themes of guilt, retribution, and atonement, and colors the tale with suggestions of the supernatural and witchcraft. The setting for the book was inspired by the Turner-Ingersoll Mansion, a gabled house in Salem, Massachusetts, belonging to Hawthorne's cousin Susanna Ingersoll, as well as ancestors of Hawthorne who had played a part in the Salem Witch Trials of 1692. The book was well received upon publication and has been adapted several times to film and television.

== Plot ==
The House of the Seven Gables was built on ground wrongfully seized from its rightful owner, Matthew Maule, by Colonel Pyncheon, the founder of the Massachusetts branch of the family. The colonel accused Maule of practicing witchcraft during the Salem witchcraft trials, and Maule was executed. According to legend, at the time of his death Maule laid a curse upon the Pyncheon family. During the housewarming festivities, Colonel Pyncheon was found dead in his armchair; whether he actually died from the curse or from a congenital disease is unclear. His portrait remains in the house as a symbol of its dark past and the weight of the curse upon the spirit of its inhabitants. Many believe the Pyncheons are under a family curse.

In the 19th century, the current resident, the dignified but desperately poor Hepzibah Pyncheon, opens a shop in a side room to support her brother Clifford, who has completed a thirty-year sentence for murder. She refuses all assistance from her wealthy but unpleasant cousin, Judge Jaffrey Pyncheon. A distant relative, the lively and pretty young Phoebe arrives and quickly becomes invaluable, charming customers and rousing Clifford from depression. A delicate romance grows between Phoebe and the mysterious attic lodger Holgrave, who is writing a history of the Pyncheon family.

Phoebe arranges to visit her country home but plans to return soon. Clifford, depressed by his isolation from humanity and his lost youth spent in prison, stands at a large arched window above the stairs and has a sudden urge to jump. The departure of Phoebe, the focus of his attention, leaves him bed-ridden.

Judge Pyncheon arrives at the house hoping to find information about land in Maine, rumored to belong to the family. He threatens Clifford with an insanity hearing unless he reveals details about the land or the location of the missing deed. Clifford is unable to comply. Before Clifford can be brought before the Judge (which would destroy Clifford's fragile psyche), the Judge mysteriously dies while sitting in Colonel Pyncheon's chair. Hepzibah and Clifford flee by train. The next day, Phoebe returns and finds that Holgrave has discovered the Judge's body. The townsfolk begin to gossip about Hepzibah and Clifford's sudden disappearance. Phoebe is relieved when Hepzibah and Clifford return, having recovered their wits.

New evidence in the crime that sent Clifford to prison proves his innocence. He was framed for the death of his uncle by Jaffrey (later Judge) Pyncheon, who was even then looking for the missing deed. Holgrave is revealed as Maule's descendant, but he bears no ill will toward the remaining Pyncheons. The missing deed is discovered behind the old Colonel's portrait, but the paper is worthless: the land is already settled by others. The characters abandon the old house and start a new life in the countryside, free from the burdens of the past.

== Characters ==
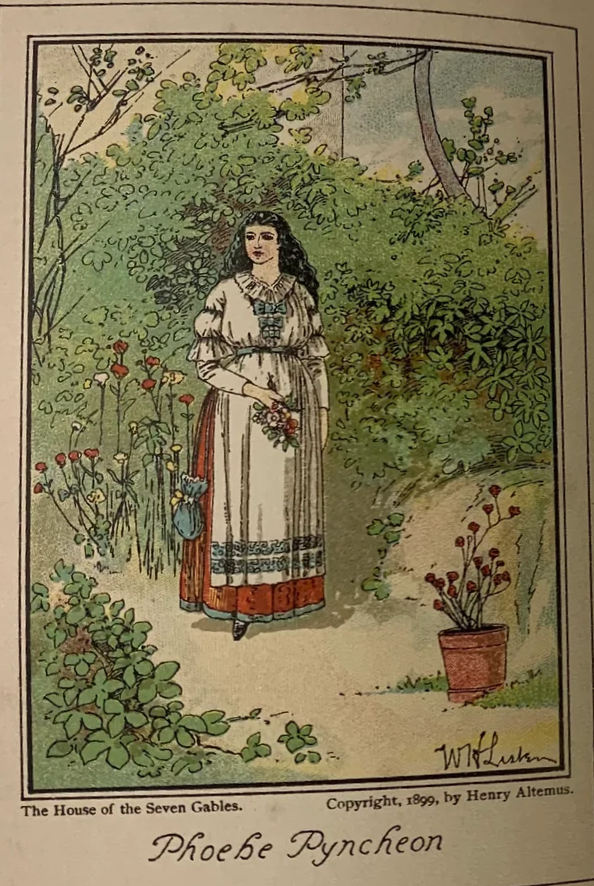
Illustration of Phoebe Pyncheon, from an 1899 edition

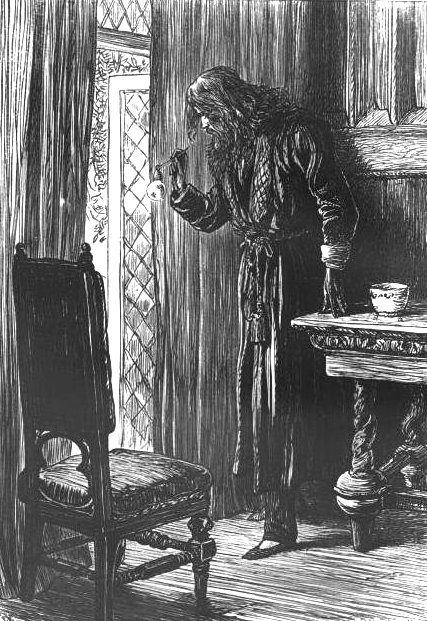
1875 illustration of Clifford Pyncheon, John Dalziel

- Hepzibah Pyncheon – An unmarried older woman. Though a member of the upper class, she is destitute. At the beginning of the novel, she opens a shop in the first floor of the house to support herself and her brother.
- Holgrave – A daguerreotypist who boards at the house. He is secretly a descendant of Matthew Maule, who had been hanged as a wizard. He falls in love with Phoebe.
- Phoebe Pyncheon – She is from the country and not a member of the Salem aristocracy. She moves in with her cousin Hepzibah and takes over the shop. Her cheerfulness and beauty make the shop a success, and charm the reclusive Clifford, to whom she serves as a kind of caretaker. Phoebe shows a willingness to work that is absent in Hepzibah and Clifford. She falls in love with Holgrave.
- Alice Pyncheon – A haughty beauty whose ghost haunts the House of the Seven Gables. Holgrave writes a story about Alice, which he reads to Phoebe. In Holgrave's story, Matthew Maule, grandson of the accused witch, is recruited by Alice's greedy father to assist in finding documents that will make him rich. Maule hypnotizes Alice, supposedly to help locate the documents. In reality, Maule intends revenge on the Pyncheons by making Alice permanently susceptible to his commands. He uses this to force her to publicly embarrass herself and her family. Alice dies of pneumonia when she is forced to go outside in the cold in only an evening dress. Maule is mortified that he has caused the death of a beautiful and refined young woman.
- Colonel Pyncheon – The founder of the Pyncheon family, the colonel was cursed by Matthew Maule. He died on the day that the House was completed, built on the site where Maule's house had been.
- Judge Jaffrey Pyncheon – A jurist and political aspirant who lives on a comfortable estate out of town. In appearance and character he so strongly resembles Colonel Pyncheon that some people mistake portraits of the ancestor for the descendant. He is just as ruthless as his ancestor in his hunt for a lost land deed, the intended source of new wealth for the dissolute Pyncheon clan.
- Matthew Maule – Original owner of the land where the House of Seven Gables is built. Colonel Pyncheon had him hanged as a wizard so that he could seize the man's property.
- Clifford Pyncheon – Hepzibah's elderly, unwell brother who lives in the house after serving a sentence for the murder of his uncle; he was framed by his cousin, Jaffrey.
- Uncle Venner – A jovial old man (older than Hepzibah) who is the only neighbor still friendly with the Pyncheons.
- Ned Higgins – A precocious boy who visits Hepzibah's shop periodically to deplete her supply of gingerbread cookies.

== Background ==
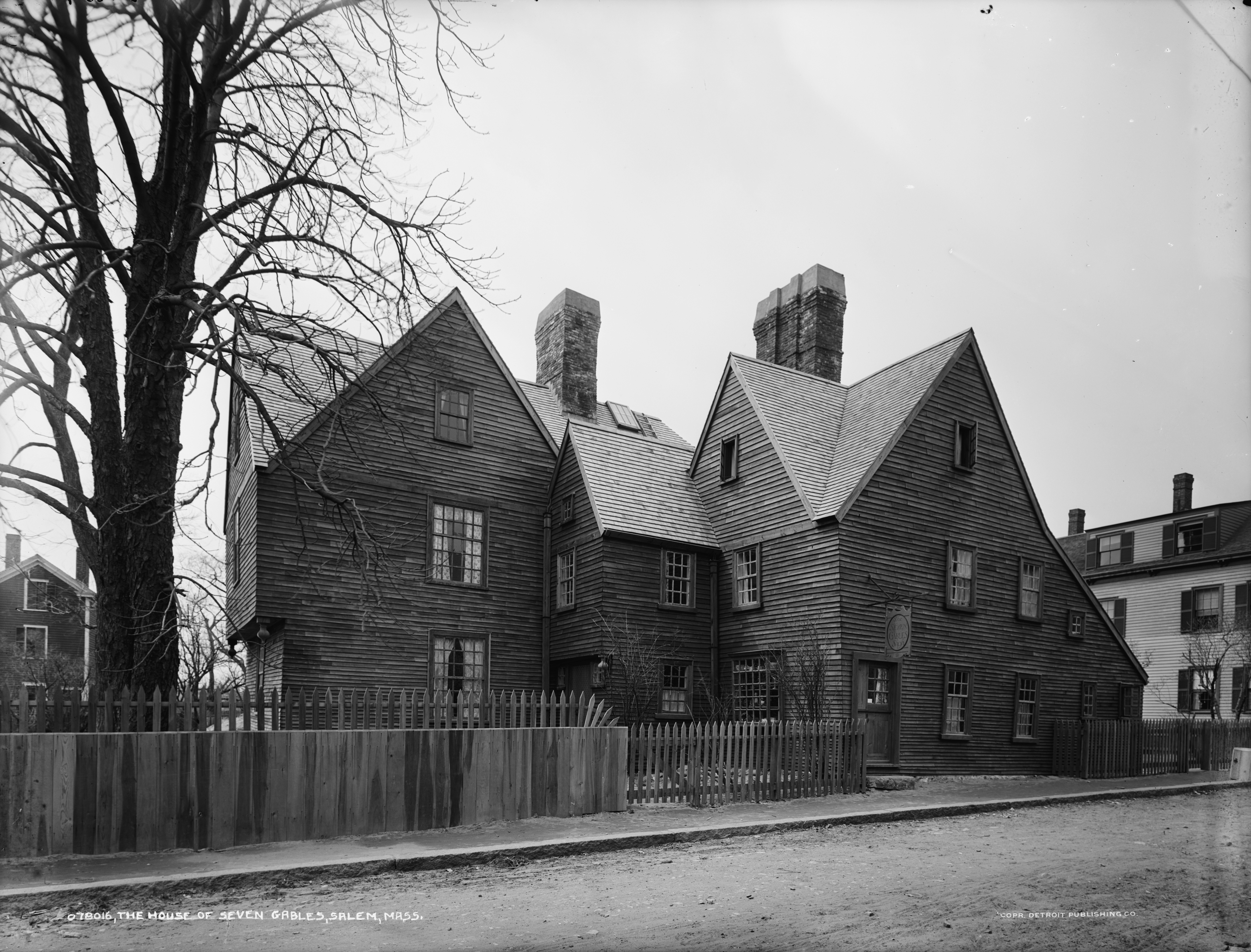
House of the Seven Gables in Salem, Massachusetts c. 1915

The novel begins:

Halfway down a by-street of one of our New England towns stands a rusty wooden house, with seven acutely peaked gables, facing towards various points of the compass, and a huge, clustered chimney in the midst. The street is Pyncheon Street; the house is the old Pyncheon House; and an elm-tree, of wide circumference, rooted before the door, is familiar to every town-born child by the title of the Pyncheon Elm.

The Pyncheon family actually existed and were ancestors of American novelist Thomas Pynchon. Hawthorne, however, did not base the story on a real family and was surprised that several "Pynchon jackasses" claimed a connection. He considered changing the fictional family's name or adding a disclaimer in the preface, though no such edits were made.

The House of the Seven Gables in Salem, Massachusetts — today a museum accompanying a settlement house — was at one time owned by Hawthorne's cousin, Susanna Ingersoll, and she entertained him there often. Its seven-gabled state was known to Hawthorne only through childhood stories from his cousin; at the time of his visits, he would have seen just three gables due to architectural renovations. Reportedly, Ingersoll inspired Hawthorne to write the novel, though Hawthorne also stated that the book was a work of complete fiction, based on no particular house.

== Publication history and response ==
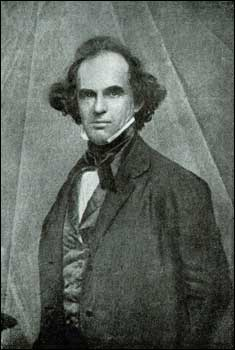
Hawthorne, c. 1848

The House of the Seven Gables was Hawthorne's follow-up to his highly successful novel The Scarlet Letter. He began writing it while living in Lenox, Massachusetts, in August 1850. By October, he had chosen the title and it was advertised as forthcoming, though the author complained of his slow progress a month later: "I write diligently, but not so rapidly as I hoped... I find the book requires more care and thought than the 'Scarlet Letter'". He hoped the book would be complete by November but would not push himself to commit to a deadline. As he forewarned, "I must not pull up my cabbage by the roots, by way of hastening its growth." By mid-January 1851, he wrote to his publisher James T. Fields that the book was nearly finished, "only I am hammering away a little on the roof, and doing a few odd jobs that were left incomplete." He sent the finished manuscript to Fields by the end of the month. His wife Sophia Hawthorne reported to her mother on January 27 that he had read her the ending the night before: "There is unspeakable grace and beauty in the conclusion, throwing back upon the sterner tragedy of the commencement an ethereal light, and a dear home-loveliness and satisfaction."

The House of the Seven Gables was released in the second week of April 1851. Two printings were issued in the first month, a third in May, and a fourth in September 1851, totaling 6,710 copies in its first year (slightly more than The Scarlet Letter in its first year). Hawthorne earned 15% in royalties from the $1.00 cover price. After its publication, Hawthorne said, "It sold finely and seems to have pleased a good many people".

Hawthorne's friend Henry Wadsworth Longfellow called it "a weird, wild book, like all he writes." Fanny Kemble reported that the book caused a sensation in England equal to Jane Eyre. English critic Henry Chorley also noted that, with The Scarlet Letter and The House of the Seven Gables, "few will dispute [Hawthorne's] claim to rank amongst the most original and complete novelists that have appeared in modern times." Some did not agree. "The book is an affliction", claimed fellow author Catharine Maria Sedgwick, adding "It affects one like a passage through the wards of an insane asylum." A review in the Christian Examiner complained the book was "more complex, the characterization more exaggerated, and the artistic execution less perfect" than the author's previous novel. Even so, Boston critic Edwin Percy Whipple simply called it his "greatest work". Hawthorne's friend Herman Melville praised the book for its dark themes in a letter to the author:

There is a certain tragic phase of humanity which, in our opinion, was never more powerfuly embodied than by Hawthorne. We mean the tragicalness of human thought in its own unbiased, native, and profounder workings. We think that into no recorded mind has the intense feeling of the visible truth ever entered more deeply than into this man's.

== Influence ==
The novel was an inspiration for horror fiction writer H. P. Lovecraft, who called it "New England's greatest contribution to weird literature" in his essay "Supernatural Horror in Literature". Seven Gables likely influenced Lovecraft's short stories "The Picture in the House", "The Shunned House" and novella The Case of Charles Dexter Ward.

== Adaptations ==
The novel had a 1940 screen adaptation with Margaret Lindsay as Hepzibah, George Sanders as Jaffrey, Vincent Price as Clifford, Dick Foran as Holgrave, and Nan Grey as Phoebe. In this adaptation, Hepzibah and Clifford were made lovers rather than brother and sister, and the film ends with a double wedding. Also, Clifford was well aware of Holgrave's true identity, and the two are working together to settle the score with Jaffrey. It was directed by Joe May with a screenplay by Lester Cole.

There was also a silent short in 1910 and a remake in 1967.

It was also loosely adapted as one of the three stories in the 1963 film Twice-Told Tales, along with "Rappaccini's Daughter" and "Dr. Heidegger's Experiment". All three sections featured Vincent Price.

The novel was adapted to a 60-minute television production in 1960 for The Shirley Temple Show with Shirley Temple as Phoebe, Robert Culp as Holgrave, Agnes Moorehead as Hepzibah, and Martin Landau as Clifford.

In 1974, the CBS Radio Mystery Theater presented a radio adaptation written by Ian Martin.

An opera based on the novel, by Scott Eyerly, premiered at the Manhattan School of Music in 2000.
