= Stephen Douglas Burton =

American composer

- Born: February 24, 1943 (age 83); Whittier, California, U.S.
- Education: Oberlin Conservatory, Peabody Conservatory, Salzburg Mozarteum
- Occupations: Composer, orchestrator, professor
- Employers: Catholic University of America (1970–1974); George Mason University (1973–2006)
- Known for: Composition, orchestration, music education
- Notable work: Orchestration (1982 textbook), restoration of silent film scores
- Awards: Guggenheim Fellowship (1969); Grants from National Endowment for the Arts, National Opera Institute, ASCAP, and others

Stephen Douglas Burton (born February 24, 1943) is an American composer.

== Life and career ==
A native of Whittier, California, Burton received his musical education at the Oberlin Conservatory, where he studied from 1960 to 1962, and Peabody Conservatory, from which he received his master's degree in 1974; he studied further at the Salzburg Mozarteum under Hans Werner Henze. From 1970 until 1974 he was on the faculty of the Catholic University of America; beginning in 1973 he taught at George Mason University, from which he retired in 2006. There he became a professor in 1983; he was named the Heritage Chair in Music in 1996. Burton has received commissions from such groups as the Berlin Philharmonic, the Chicago Symphony Orchestra, and the Orchestre National de France. Active as well in the field of film music, he worked with Gillian Anderson to restore the original scores for the 1922 version of Robin Hood, the 1925 version of Ben-Hur, The Passion of Joan of Arc and the 1923 version of The Ten Commandments; the last-named score was used when the film reopened Grauman's Egyptian Theater in 1998. As an orchestrator, Burton assisted in the preparation of Gian-Carlo Menotti's Goya before its 1987 premiere. His textbook Orchestration, published in 1982, is popularly used in the teaching of the discipline.

Burton received a Guggenheim Fellowship in 1969. During his career he has received five grants from the National Endowment for the Arts, as well as grants from the National Opera Institute; the American Society of Composers, Authors, and Publishers; the Myers Foundation; the Kipplinger Foundation; the Dreyfus Foundation; and the Coolidge Foundation.

== Works ==
Adapted from:

=== Stage ===
- No Trifling with Love (opera, one act, libretto by the composer after Alfred de Musset), 1970
- Finisterre (ballet), 1970
- An American Triptych (three one-act operas, librettos by the composer), 1975
  - Maggie (after Stephen Crane)
  - Dr. Heidegger's Experiment (after Nathaniel Hawthorne)
  - Benito Cereno (after Herman Melville)
- The Duchess of Malfi (opera, three acts, libretto by Christopher Keene after John Webster), 1975–1978

=== Symphonies ===
- Symphony no. 1, for orchestra, 1968
- Symphony no. 2, Ariel, for mezzo-soprano, baritone, and orchestra, on texts by Sylvia Plath, 1976
- Symphony no. 3, Songs of the Tulpehocken for tenor and orchestra, on Pennsylvania German folk texts, 1976
- Symphony no. 4, Homage to Bach for organ and orchestra, 1980
- Symphony no. 5, Prelude, for orchestra, 1981
- Symphony no. 6, "I Have a Dream", for soprano, narrator, chorus, and orchestra, on text by the composer after Martin Luther King Jr., 1987
- Symphony no. 7, The Tempest, for orchestra, 1988

=== Other ===
- Ode to a Nightingale for soprano and orchestra, to a text by John Keats, 1962
- Stravinskiana, concerto for flute and orchestra, 1971
- Dithyramb for orchestra, 1972
- String Quartet, 1973
- Impressione Romani for piano, percussion, and tape, 1974
- Six songs to texts by Hermann Hesse for soprano and chamber ensemble, 1974
- 6 Hebrew Melodies for mezzo-soprano and piano on texts by Lord Byron, 1975
- Eurydice for violin and chamber ensemble, 1977
- Fanfare for Peace for orchestra, 1983
- Consecration for fourteen brass and eight timpani, 1996
