= Alfred G. Fischer =

German-American geologist (1920–2017)

- Born: Alfred Georg Hubertus Fischer; December 12, 1920; Rotenburg an der Fulda, Weimar Republic
- Died: July 2, 2017 (aged 96); Santa Barbara, California, U.S.
- Occupations: Geologist; Professor

Academic background
- Education: University of Wisconsin–Madison (BS, MS); Columbia University (PhD)

Academic work
- Discipline: Geology
- Sub-discipline: Petroleum geology
- Institutions: Virginia Polytechnic Institute; University of Rochester; University of Kansas; Princeton University; University of Southern California

Alfred Georg Hubertus Fischer (December 12, 1920 – July 2, 2017) was a German-American geologist. Among his influential work was the examination of the climate record over geological time scales and latitudinal gradients in species diversity and numbers across geological time.

== Life and work ==
Fischer was born at Rotenburg an der Fulda, Hesse, and grew up near Berchtesgaden in Bavaria. He went to high school in Wiesbaden and in 1935, his family moved to the US. He then went to college in Watertown, Wisconsin. He studied geology at the University of Wisconsin, where he was awarded a bachelor's degree in 1939 and a master's degree in 1940.

From 1941-1943 he worked at the Virginia Polytechnic Institute. In 1943-44 he was a geologist for Stanolind Oil and Gas in Kansas and from 1944 to 1946 a geologist in Florida. In 1947 he taught at the University of Rochester and from 1948 at the University of Kansas, where he was an assistant professor. In 1950 he gained a doctorate at Columbia University.

For five years from 1951 to 1956 he was a petroleum geologist (Senior Geologist) for Esso in Peru (Talara and Lima) before becoming assistant professor in 1956 and professor in 1963 at Princeton University. In 1984 he was appointed professor at the University of Southern California in Los Angeles, becoming emeritus professor in 1991. He was also a visiting professor in Innsbruck, Tübingen and Berlin.

Fischer studied marine sedimentology and marine fossil fauna and was a leading scientist in the Deep Sea Drilling Project. He described in 1964 the phenomenon of rhythmically recurring sequences of sedimentary rock layers in some Triassic formations of the Alps, first discovered in Dachstein Limestone in the province of Salzburg. In the 1960s he examined latitudinal variation in the fossil record and in the 1970s, he propagated the existence of global biorhythms in the fossil record and in 1977 the concept of cycles of low and high levels of biodiversity in the marine fauna over 32 million years. In 1982 he spoke in favour of the Earth's climate alternating between ice ages and warm periods due to the (Icehouse-Greenhouse concept).

== Honors and awards ==
- 2009 Mary Clark Thompson Medal
- 1994 Elected member of the US National Academy of Sciences
- 1992 Gustav-Steinmann-Medaille for his pioneering insights into the rhythms of life and the Earth's climate.
- 1992 Lyell Medal
- 1982 William H. Twenhofel Medal
- 1972 Leopold-von-Buch-Plakette award of the German Geological Society
- 1969 Guggenheim Fellowship

He was a member of the American Association for the Advancement of Science. He received honorary doctorates from the University of Tübingen.

== Publications ==
- The Lofer cyclothems of the alpine Triassic, Kansas State Geol. Surv. Bull. 169, Vol 1, 1964, pp 107–150.
- Gilbert—bedding rhythms and geochronology, in Ellis Yochelson (Hrsg.) The Scientific Ideas of G. K. Gilbert, Geol. Soc. Am. Spec. Papers 183, 1980, pp 93–104.
- Climatic oscillations in the biosphere, in M. Nitecki (Herausgeber) Biotic Crises in Ecological and Evolutionary Time, Academic Press, New York, 1981, pp 103–131.
- Climatic rhythms recorded in strata, Annual Reviews, Earth and Planetary Science, Vol 14, 1981, pp 351–367
- with D. J. Bottjer, Orbital forcing and sedimentary sequences, Journal of Sedimentary Petrology, Vol 61, 1991, pp 1063–1069
- with M. A. Arthur, Secular variations in the pelagic realm, in H. E. Cook, P. Enos (Hrsg.) Deep Water Carbonate Environments, Soc. Econ. Paleontol. Mineral. Spec. Publ. 25, 1977, pp 18–50
- with T. D. Herbert, Stratification-rhythms. Italo-American Studies in the Umbrian facies, Memoria della Societa Geologica Italiana, Vol 31, 1986, pp 45–51
- with T. D. Herbert, Milankovitch climatic origin of the mid-cretaceous black-shale rhythms in Central Italy, Nature, Vol 321, 1986, pp 739–743
- Orbital cyclicity in mesozoic strata, in G. Einsele, W. Ricken, A. Seilacher Cycles and events in stratigraphy, Springer 1991, pp 48–62
- Long term climatic oscillations recorded in stratigraphy, in Climate in Earth History: Studies in Geophysics, National Academy of Sciences Press 1982, Online
- Fischer, S. Honjo, Garrison Electron micrographs of limestones and their nannofossils, Princeton University Press 1967
- Fischer, Garrison, Carbonate lithification on the sea floor, J. Geology, Vol 75, 1976, pp 488–496
