= Twice-Told Tales (film) =

1963 horror-film by Sidney Salkow

- Directed by: Sidney Salkow
- Written by: Robert E. Kent
- Based on: "Dr. Heidegger's Experiment" (1837) "Rappaccini's Daughter" (1844); The House of the Seven Gables (1851) by Nathaniel Hawthorne
- Produced by: Robert E. Kent; Edward Small (executive)
- Starring: Vincent Price; Sebastian Cabot; Brett Halsey; Beverly Garland; Richard Denning; Joyce Taylor
- Narrated by: Vincent Price
- Cinematography: Ellis W. Carter
- Edited by: Grant Whytlock
- Music by: Richard LaSalle
- Production company: Admiral Pictures Robert E. Kent Productions
- Distributed by: United Artists
- Release date: September 1963
- Running time: 120 minutes
- Language: English

Twice-Told Tales is a 1963 American horror anthology film directed by Sidney Salkow and starring Vincent Price. It consists of three segments, all loosely adapted by producer/screenwriter Robert E. Kent from works by Nathaniel Hawthorne.

== Plot ==
Each of the three sequences is introduced by Vincent Price (in a voice-over). Price also stars in all three narratives.

=== "Dr. Heidegger's Experiment" ===
In 1859, two elderly friends, Carl Heidegger (Sebastian Cabot) and Alex (Price), meet to celebrate Heidegger's 79th birthday. They discover that Heidegger's fiancée from 38 years before, Sylvia (Mari Blanchard), is perfectly preserved in her coffin. Heidegger believes that the water dripping into the coffin from the crypt's ceiling has the power to preserve, and perhaps to reinvigorate. He tries it on a withered rose and it comes back into full bloom.

Carl and Alex drink the water and become young again. Carl injects the liquid into Sylvia and she comes back to life. Carl overhears Sylvia and Alex speaking and learns that they were secretly lovers before Alex poisoned Sylvia. Carl attacks Alex but Alex accidentally kills him in the struggle. Carl's body returns to its true age and Alex realises that the effects of the water are temporary. Sylvia is reduced to a desiccated skeleton and Alex's body too returns to its original age. Alex returns to the crypt in desperation to find more of the water but it no longer flows.

=== "Rappaccini's Daughter" ===
In Padua, Giacomo Rappaccini (Price) keeps his daughter Beatrice (Joyce Taylor) in a garden. A university student next door, Giovanni (Brett Halsey), sees her and falls in love. One of Giovanni's professors says that he used to teach with Rappaccini. Many years earlier, Rappaccini abruptly quit academia and became a recluse after his wife ran away with a lover. Rappaccini has treated Beatrice with an exotic plant extract that makes her touch deadly to keep her safe from unwanted suitors, but it also makes her a prisoner in her own home.

When Rappaccini sees the attraction between Giovanni and Beatrice, he surreptitiously treats Giovanni with the extract so they can be together. Giovanni is aghast and obtains an experimental antidote from his professor. He consumes the antidote in front of Beatrice but it kills him. Beatrice drinks it also, killing herself. Having lost everything of value, Rappaccini grabs the exotic plant with both hands and allows its touch to kill him.

=== "The House of the Seven Gables" ===
Gerald Pyncheon (Price) returns to his family house after an absence of 17 years, bringing with him his wife Alice (Beverly Garland). His sister Hannah (Jacqueline deWit), who has been living in the house, tells Alice about the curse put upon Pyncheon men by Mathew Maulle, who used to own the house but lost it in a shady deal to the Pyncheon family. Jonathan Maulle (Richard Denning), a descendant of Mathew, arrives but he refuses Gerald's offer to give him the house in exchange for the location of a vault where valuable property deeds are stored. Alice becomes haunted by the curse on the house, which eventually leads her to the cellar.

Gerald finds her there and, lifting up the slab over the grave of Mathew Maulle, discovers the map to the vault. He kills Hannah to keep her share of the inheritance for himself. Gerald traps Alice in the grave, then goes to the study to find the vault. When he opens it, a skeletal hand inside reaches out and kills him. Jonathan arrives and takes Alice out of the house just as it shakes and collapses into rubble.

== Cast ==
- Vincent Price as Alex Medbourne / Giacomo Rappaccini / Gerald Pyncheon
- Sebastian Cabot as Dr. Carl Heidegger
- Brett Halsey as Giovanni Guasconti
- Beverly Garland as Alice Pyncheon
- Richard Denning as Jonathan Maulle
- Mari Blanchard as Sylvia Ward
- Abraham Sofaer as Prof. Pietro Baglioni
- Jacqueline deWit as Hannah Pyncheon, Gerald's Sister
- Joyce Taylor as Beatrice Rappaccini
- Edith Evanson as Lisabetta, the landlady
- Floyd Simmons as Ghost of Mathew Maulle
- Gene Roth as Cabman

== Production background ==
The film is an 'omnibus'-style film based on two of Nathaniel Hawthorne's stories, "Dr. Heidegger's Experiment" (1837) and "Rappaccini's Daughter" (1844), and on the novel The House of the Seven Gables (1851), which had previously been adapted in 1940 also starring Price. Only "Dr. Heidegger's Experiment" was actually published in Hawthorne's Twice-Told Tales, which supplied the film's title. Similar to Tales of Terror (1962), Price appeared in all three segments.

== Production ==
Filming started on Halloween 1962.

== See also ==
- List of American films of 1963
