= Walter Kauzmann =

American chemist

Walter J. Kauzmann
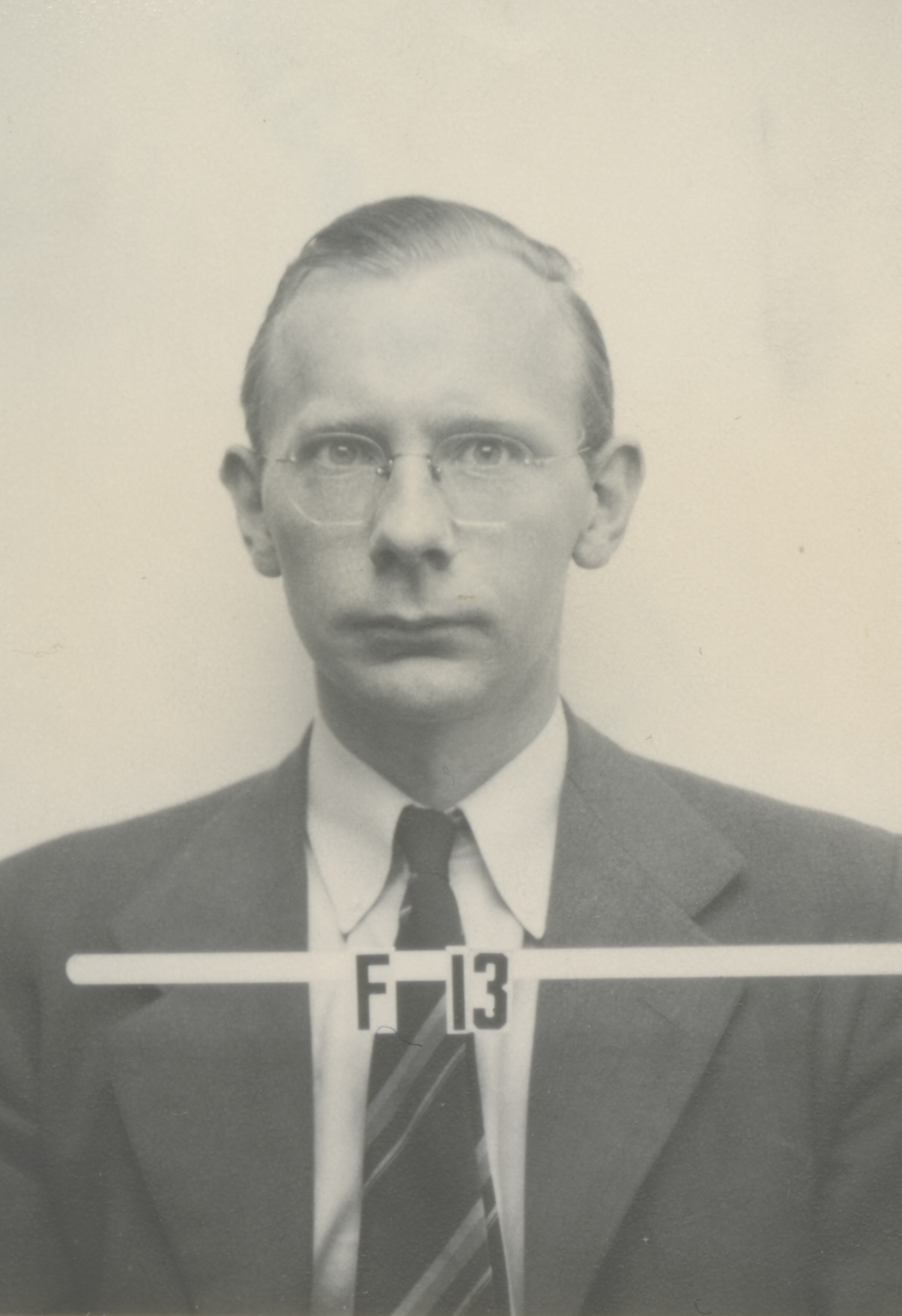
- Kauzmann's Los Alamos badge
- Born: August 18, 1916; Mount Vernon, New York, U.S.
- Died: January 27, 2009 (aged 92); Montgomery, New Jersey, U.S.
- Education: Cornell University (B.A.), Princeton University (Ph.D.)
- Scientific career
- Fields: Chemist
- Workplaces: Princeton University
- Doctoral advisor: Henry Eyring

Walter J. Kauzmann (18 August 1916 – 27 January 2009) was an American chemist and professor emeritus of Princeton University. He was noted for his work in both physical chemistry and biochemistry. His most important contribution was recognizing that the hydrophobic effect plays a key role in determining the three-dimensional structure of proteins. He is also well known for an insight into the nature of supercooled liquids which is now known as Kauzmann's paradox. At Princeton, Kauzmann was the David B. Jones Professor Emeritus of Chemistry. He chaired the department of chemistry from 1964 to 1968 and the department of biochemical sciences from 1980 to 1981.

He was born in Mount Vernon, New York, and grew up in New Rochelle, New York. He was the son of the German-born Albert F. Kauzmann, who came to the United States in 1895, and Julia (Kahle) Kauzmann. Albert operated a gem-importing business in Lower Manhattan and would often bring his son to work on Saturday mornings. They would spend the afternoon at the American Museum of Natural History or attend a matinee at the Metropolitan Opera, nurturing Walter's lifelong love of science and music.

Kauzmann earned a B.A. degree in 1937 from Cornell University, which he attended on a full scholarship. He started his doctoral work at Princeton University in organic chemistry, but switched to physical chemistry, earning a Ph.D. in 1940 under the direction of Henry Eyring. Following his Ph.D., Kauzmann had a two-year postdoctoral appointment in Pittsburgh as a Westinghouse Research Fellow, in the laboratory led by Edward U. Condon. It was during this period that Kauzmann wrote his now classic paper on supercooled liquids and glasses that contained the Kauzmann paradox. At the end of this fellowship, with the U.S. fighting WWII, Kauzmann joined the U.S. government's National Defense Research Council laboratory in Bruceton, Pennsylvania, which was directed by George Kistiakowsky, and worked on chemical explosives.

In 1944, Kauzmann was recruited into the top secret Manhattan Project and he moved to Los Alamos, New Mexico. Eventually, Kauzmann was put in charge of producing the detonator for the Trinity test, which was the first detonation of an atomic bomb, and of the (Fat Man) plutonium bomb that was dropped on Nagasaki, Japan. Kauzmann witnessed the Trinity test on July 16, 1945, and his memories were recorded in a newspaper article. Fifty years later, Kauzmann discussed why he worked on the atomic bomb:

But there was another, even stronger reason that many of us felt justified our working as hard as we could on the bomb. It was felt that if it were possible to make atomic bombs, somewhere, someday, someone would figure out how to do it and some country would proceed to make them. If this were done after World War II was over, the bomb would very likely be made as a secret weapon. This would inevitably lead to World War III. Therefore, there were strong reasons for trying to make the bomb – and use it – before the end of World War II. The people of the world would then know the terrible thing that could be unleashed if there were a World War III. And the politicians could then be encouraged to try to do something about preventing World War III.

In 1946, Kauzmann returned to Princeton as an assistant professor of chemistry and remained on Princeton's faculty throughout his long academic career. His work was centered in the area of biophysical chemistry, particularly the studies of the structure and thermodynamics of proteins. His insight that hydrophobic interactions play a key role in stabilizing protein structure was made before X-ray crystallography provided the first three-dimensional structures of proteins. Kauzmann's model, that proteins fold to bury hydrophobic residues and to expose hydrophilic ones, has stood the test of time and is one of the key principles of de novo protein structure prediction. Kauzmann became an emeritus professor in 1982.

His first book, Quantum Chemistry, was published in 1957, followed by The Kinetic Theory of Gases (1966) and Thermodynamics and Statistics (1967). With David Eisenberg, a former postdoctoral fellow of Kauzmann, he wrote The Structure and Properties of Water (1969), a book reissued in 2005 by Oxford University Press as part of its Classic Texts in the Physical Sciences series. The first three are textbooks for undergraduate physical chemistry, which Kauzmann taught at Princeton for many years. Kauzmann's pedagogy is discussed in an article by Bruce Alberts.

Kauzmann married Elizabeth Flagler Kauzmann, then a research assistant in the laboratory of Frank Johnson in the Princeton's biology department, in April, 1951. Elizabeth died in 2004 after more than 50 years of marriage. They are survived by two sons, a daughter, and eight grandchildren. They summered on Cape Breton Island, and eventually donated 40 acres (160,000 m^{2}) of their property to the Nova Scotia Nature Trust.

== Awards and honors ==
- Guggenheim Fellowships (1957 and 1994)
- Elected to the American Academy of Arts and Sciences (1963)
- Elected to the United States National Academy of Sciences (1964)
- Inaugural Linderstrøm-Lang Prize for outstanding contributions in the areas of biochemistry or physiology (1966).
- Honorary Ph.D. from The University of Stockholm (1992)
- Stein and Moore Award of the Protein Society “for his seminal work on the physical chemistry of proteins.” (1993)
- A special issue of Elsevier's 'Biophysical Chemistry' was published in September 2003, Volume 105, Issues 2–3, Pages 153–772, to celebrate Walter Kauzmann's 85th Birthday.
- Princeton University established an annual Walter Kauzmann Lectureship in Chemistry. (2008)
