= Dr. Heidegger's Experiment =

- Short story by Nathaniel Hawthorne
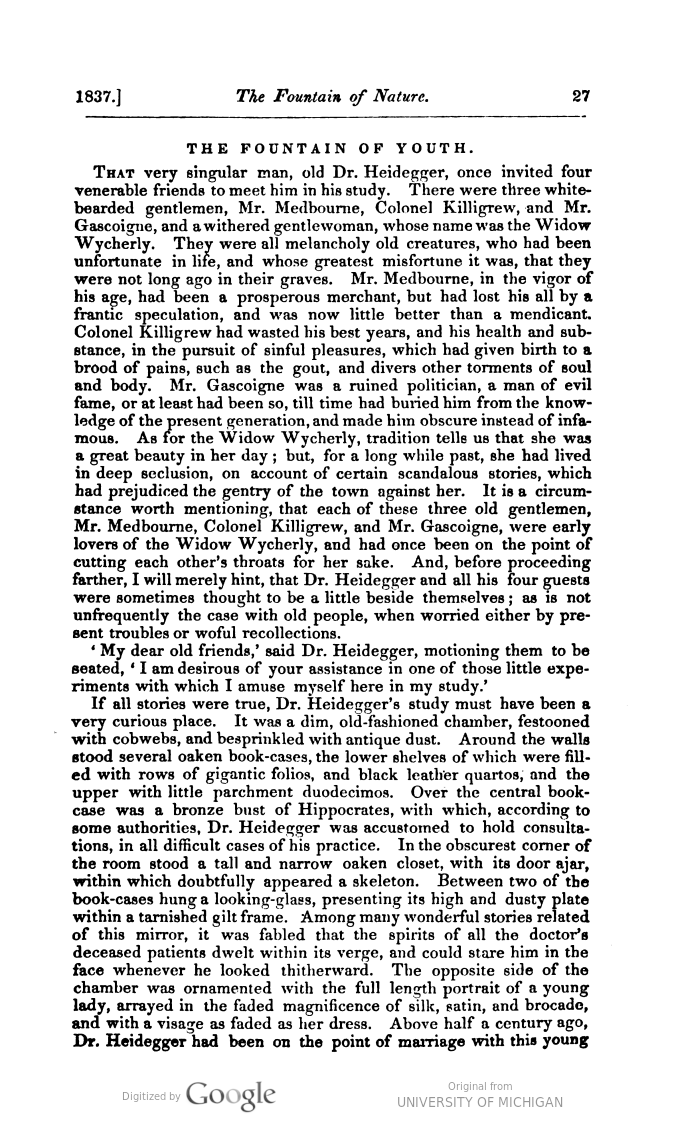

Text available at Wikisource
- Original title: The Fountain of Youth
- Country: United States
- Language: English
- Genres: fiction, short story

Publication
- Published in: The Knickerbocker, Vol. IX, p. 27
- Publication date: January 1837

"Dr. Heidegger's Experiment" is a short story by American author Nathaniel Hawthorne. The story is about a doctor who claims to have been sent water from the Fountain of Youth. Originally published anonymously in 1837, it was included in Hawthorne's collection Twice-Told Tales later that same year.

== Plot ==
Dr. Heidegger, an eccentric aged scientist, invites four elderly friends (Mr. Medbourne, a destitute man, who was a merchant in his youth but had squandered his wealth in wrong investments; Colonel Kiligrew, an elderly ailing man who had indulged himself in ‘sinful pleasures’; Mr. Gascoigne, a forgotten politician who displayed hypocrisy throughout his career; and the Widow Wycherley, a once-beautiful woman ostracised by her community for having a number of scandalous relationships with several men, including the three present) to participate in an experiment in his mysterious, gloomy study.

He shows them a withered rose that he claims is fifty-five years old, from his deceased fiancée Sylvia Ward (prior to their wedding, Sylvia had contracted a slight disorder; Heidegger had given her one of her experimental prescriptions, which killed her on her bridal evening). He then displays a vase, a gift from an acquaintance, that contains a generous quantity of sparkling water. Heidegger explains that this bewitching water is from the legendary Fountain of Youth, near Lake Macaco (now known as Lake Okeechobee, in Florida). The water wondrously causes the old rose to bloom again when it is dropped into it.

Dr. Heidegger's friends become cautiously intrigued. They wish to taste the water, hoping it will restore their youth and give them an opportunity to live life again, free from the mistakes they made when they were young. As Heidegger watches, they anxiously drink the water. Their youth restored, they begin acting as fatuously as they did in their prime. Soon, the three men of the group begin competing for the attention of the now-youthful and beautiful widow. While experiencing their newfound youth, however, a tall ominous mirror in the study reflects an image of the four guests as still being elderly and feeble. The vase is accidentally smashed as the men fight over the widow, and its miraculous water is lost.

As Heidegger protests against the four, the rose begins fading, restored back to its ‘dry and fragile’ state. To the four guests’ horror, they return to their old selves. Heidegger realises that giving the four a second chance to live their youth once again, has brought them back to their flaws, further stating that “… for if the fountain gushed at (his) very doorstep, (he) would not stoop to bathe (his) lips in it.”

To obtain more of the enchanted water, the four guests arrange to travel to Florida to find the Fountain of Youth.

== Characters ==
- Dr. Heidegger - An aged physician, who is the protagonist of the story.
- Colonel Killigrew - A man who, throughout his life, has had many self-indulgent, sinful pleasures.
- Mr. Medbourne - A once-rich merchant who lost most of his fortune in speculation.
- Mr. Gascoigne - A politician whose career was ruined by his corruption.
- Widow Wycherley - A formerly beautiful woman loved by the three gentlemen (Colonel Killigrew, Mr. Medbourne, Mr. Gascoigne).
- Sylvia Ward- A youthful woman whose portrait hangs upon a wall in the study. She was supposed to marry Dr. Heidegger but died the day before their marriage. (The rose Dr. Heidegger uses in his experiment is one he received from Sylvia for their wedding.)

== Publication history and response ==
The story was first published anonymously as "The Fountain of Youth" in the January 1837 issue of Lewis Gaylord Clark's The Knickerbocker magazine in New York. Clark, who had invited Hawthorne to contribute, noted that he had "rarely read anything which delighted" him more.

The story was included later that year in Hawthorne's collection Twice-Told Tales. Park Benjamin Sr. reviewed the collection for the American Monthly Magazine and called it a rival to the work of Washington Irving. He specified that "Dr. Heidegger's Experiment" served as "a very apt companion-piece" to Irving's "Mutability of Literature". An anonymous reviewer in the Boston Daily Advertiser, however, noted that the stories in the collection were of "unequal merit" and preferred "the grace and sweetness of such papers as 'Little Annie's Ramble,' or 'A Rill from the Town-pump,' to those of a more ambitious cast, and in which the page glows with a wider and more fearful interest, like 'The Minister's Black Veil' and 'Dr. Heidegger's Experiment.'" Edgar Allan Poe reviewed the second edition of the collection in 1842 and wrote that "Dr. Heidegger's Experiment" was "exceedingly well imagined, and executed with surpassing ability. The artist breathes in every line of it."

== Adaptations ==
- "Dr. Heidegger's Experiment", an episode of the old-time radio program Favorite Story. It first aired on May 15, 1948, and was hosted by Ronald Colman. It starred John McIntire as Dr. Heidegger, Lurene Tuttle, Earle Ross, Arthur Q. Bryan, and Norman Field. It was selected by Robert Walker as his favorite story.
- Billie Burke starred in an adaptation of the story on the TV version of Lights Out on November 20, 1950.
- Dr. Heidegger's Fountain of Youth, chamber opera by Jack Beeson and Sheldon Harnick (1979)
- Britannica Classic: Nathaniel Hawthorne's Dr. Heidegger's Experiment, adapted as a short film, dramatized by the Encyclopædia Britannica Educational Corporation in 1969. Available for viewing online at http://www.britannica.com/EBchecked/topic/1685292/Doctor-Heideggers-Experiment. (It stars Peter Brocco.)
- It was included, with significant changes, as the first segment of the 1963 movie Twice-Told Tales starring Vincent Price
- The story was adapted by Stephen Douglas Burton as one of three one-act operas in his 1975 trilogy, An American Triptych.
