= Larry Kevan =

American chemist

Larry James Kevan (December 12, 1938 – June 4, 2002) was an American chemist.

Kevan was born in Kansas City, Missouri on December 12, 1938, and attended the University of Kansas to study chemistry. Upon completing his undergraduate degree in 1960, Kevan pursued doctoral study at the University of California, Los Angeles, under the direction of Willard Libby. After obtaining his doctorate in 1963, Kevan became a postdoctoral researcher at the University of Newcastle, then returned to the United States later that year to serve as a chemistry instructor at the University of Chicago. Between 1965 and 1969, Kevan taught at the University of Kansas. Kevan left his alma mater for a position at Wayne State University. During his eleven-year tenure at Wayne State, Kevan was awarded a Guggenheim fellowship in 1969, and elected to fellowship of the American Physical Society in 1972. He joined the University of Houston faculty in 1980, where he was the Cullen Distinguished Professor of Chemistry at the time of his death on June 4, 2002.
