= John Anthony Schellman =

American biophysical chemist (1924–2014)

John Anthony Schellman Professor emeritus
- Born: October 24, 1924; Philadelphia
- Died: December 16, 2014 (aged 90); Eugene, Oregon
- Occupations: Biophysical chemist and academic
- Known for: Thermodynamics and optical spectroscopies of biological macromolecules

Academic background
- Education: A.B., 1948, Temple University; M.A., 1949 and Ph.D., 1951, both at Princeton University
- Thesis: The Theory of the Dielectric Properties of Ice
- Doctoral advisor: Walter Kauzmann

John Anthony Schellman (October 24, 1924–December 16, 2014) was an American biophysical chemist at the University of Oregon, a member of the National Academy of Sciences, a Biophysical Society Fellow, and an American Physical Society Fellow.

== Early life and education ==
The son of John A. and Margaret Mary (née Mason) Schellman, John Anthony Schellman was born in Philadelphia on October 24, 1924. His father, a machinist, lost his position when the shop where he worked closed during the Great Depression. His father delivered milk and eggs in a horse-drawn wagon, and his mother sang Irish ballads in taverns for extra cash. Schellman especially enjoyed high school chemistry, and reportedly came close to burning down the house when a basement experiment caught fire.

After high school, his family's limited finances did not allow him to attend college. Schellman worked in a factory, then in the Philadelphia Gas Works laboratory, a lab doing applied research. He also took a chemistry class after work at Temple University. Drafted during World War II, because of poor eyesight he was deemed unfit for combat, and he was assigned to the Army's medical laboratory at Walter Reed Hospital in Washington. He became head of the laboratory.

After his army service, Schellman used his G.I. Bill benefits and completed an A.B at Temple University, Phi Beta Kappa, in just two years, in 1948. He earned an M.A. in 1949 and a Ph.D. in Theoretical Chemistry in 1951, both at Princeton University. His dissertation was titled, The Theory of the Dielectric Properties of Ice, and was advised by Walter Kauzmann.

== Career ==
=== Post-doctoral fellowship ===
Schellman's first postdoctoral fellowship was a U.S. Public Health Service award from NIH, with Leo Samuels at the University of Utah Medical School, working to improve chemical and biological assays of steroid hormones. Although he did not find that work interesting, he was still interested in proteins, and transferred his postdoctoral fellowship to Carlsberg Laboratory in Copenhagen, Denmark, with Kaj Linderstrøm-Lang. He and post-doc Bill Harrington were the first to show "protein unfolding transitions were fast and reversible and thus were reactions suitable for quantitative physico-chemical analysis", initiating reversible protein-folding asa major field of work. Schellman also developed "optical rotatory dispersion (ORD)" to measure α-helix and β-sheet secondary structures of proteins.

Robert L. Baldwin wrote,

In 1955 John Schellman wrote a paper estimating the stability of the α-helix in aqueous solution. Four years earlier Pauling and Corey had proposed that the α-helix should be a major structural unit in proteins, but no one had yet seen an α-helix. Only in 1958, when Kendrew and co-workers determined the structure of the first protein (sperm whale myoglobin) at 0.6 nm resolution, could α-helices begin to be seen. So John's paper was on the cutting edge, to put it mildly. His was also the first modern paper on the energetics of protein folding: Kauzmann's landmark paper on the energetic importance of burying non-polar side chains in the interior of proteins appeared 4 years later in 1959.

Schellman's ensuing research led to three important developments. First, he "derived an equation to analyze how the number of H-bonds made between urea molecules in water should change when a concentrated urea solution is diluted", yielding measurements suggesting "the peptide H-bond should be marginally stable in water". Second, he asked, "How stable is a single α-helix in water?" and "concluded from his study that a single α-helix should have borderline stability in water, and that helix length should be a critical variable in determining helix stability". Third, with Harrington he investigated how a neighboring tertiary structure might affect the stability of an α-helix, learning "that indeed tertiary structure and other stabilizing elements (such as inter-chain S-S bonds) might be critical in stabilizing the individual secondary structure elements of globular proteins".

In Copenhagen Schellman met Frances "Charlotte" Green, of St. Joseph, Missouri, who was a post-doc from Caltech, and they married in 1954. (She developed the "Schellman motif", on α-helix termination in proteins by a characteristic sequence.) According to Baldwin and von Hippel, "Their ORD results were published in a magnum opus (seven papers on ten proteins) in 1958, after they had left the Carlsberg Lab."

=== Faculty positions ===
In 1956 Schellman joined the faculty of the Chemistry Department of the University of Minnesota. In 1958 the Schellmans moved to the University of Oregon, where he held joint appointments as an associate professor in the departments of Chemistry and the Institute of Molecular Biology, and she was an adjunct professor. He was promoted to professor in 1963, and he retired as professor emeritus in 1990.

Of Schellman's work at Oregon, Robert Baldwin and Peter von Hippel wrote,

...John dug deeper into the problems he had opened up at the Carlsberg Lab and began to analyze the physical properties of DNA. He clarified the foundations of the subjects he studied, especially of circular dichroism and the energetics of protein folding. In 1962 John and his student Patrick Oriel found that the n-pi* transition of the peptide group is responsible for the Cotton effect that is used to measure α-helix formation in ORD studies. (In CD studies, the n-pi* transition is responsible for the 220 nm CD band that is used to measure α-helix content.) ...In the 1970s the study of protein mutants became an important approach to the protein folding problem and John and his coworkers developed methods of analyzing the properties of mutant proteins. John's methods were widely used, both in equilibrium studies of mutational effects on protein stability and in kinetic studies of how mutations affect the rates of protein folding.

In a special festschrift issue of the journal Biophysical Chemistry upon Schellman's retirement in 2002, Hong Qian, James Hofrichter, and Robert L. Baldwin wrote that his scientific career hasd "paralleled the development of biophysical chemistry." Referring to his "landmark paper on the stability of the α-helix in 1955", as well as his research and teaching, they commented on his work in the tradition of Linderstrøm-Lang, with his wife Charlotte. They wrote he was "instrumental in bringing the rigor and methodology of physical chemistry (yes, including physics, mathematics and spectroscopy!) into the center stage of biochemistry and molecular biology. An essential characteristic of John's work is the integration of theoretical analysis with experimental measurement."

Colleague Henryk Eisenberg wrote that Schellman's studies were strong "in the examination of biological macromolecules, proteins and nucleic acids, in terms of their interactions with large and small molecules, solvents and solutes, sometimes in 'crowded' environments, mimicking biological media." Eisenberg said Shellman's contributions included, "fluctuations and linkage relations in macromolecular solutions w25x, a simple model for solvation in mixed solvents w26x, the relation between the free energy of interaction and binding w27x and the thermodynamics of solvent exchange w28x."

== Selected publications ==
- Schellman, John A. (July 1, 2003). "Protein Stability in Mixed Solvents: A Balance of Contact Interaction and Excluded Volume". Biophysical Journal. 85 (1): 108–125. Bibcode:2003BpJ....85..108S. doi:10.1016/S0006-3495(03)74459-2. ISSN 0006-3495. PMC 1303070. PMID 12829469.
- Chakrabartty, Avijit; Schellman, John A.; Baldwin, Robert L. (June 1991). "Large differences in the helix propensities of alanine and glycine". Nature. 351 (6327): 586–588. Bibcode:1991Natur.351..586C. doi:10.1038/351586a0. ISSN 1476-4687. PMID 2046766. S2CID 4324047.
- Becktel, Wayne J.; Schellman, John A. (November 1987). "Protein stability curves". Biopolymers. 26 (11): 1859–1877. doi:10.1002/bip.360261104. ISSN 0006-3525. PMID 3689874. S2CID 5160255.
- Schellman, John A. (April 1987). "Selective binding and solvent denaturation". Biopolymers. 26 (4): 549–559. doi:10.1002/bip.360260408. ISSN 0006-3525. PMID 3567326. S2CID 36875587.
- Schellman, John A. (May 1978). "Solvent denaturation". Biopolymers. 17 (5): 1305–1322. doi:10.1002/bip.1978.360170515. ISSN 0006-3525. S2CID 221463468.
- Gosule, Leonard C.; Schellman, John A. (May 25, 1978). "DNA condensation with polyamines: I. Spectroscopic studies". Journal of Molecular Biology. 121 (3): 311–326. doi:10.1016/0022-2836(78)90366-2. ISSN 0022-2836. PMID 671540.
- Gosule, Leonard C.; Schellman, John A. (May 25, 1978). "DNA condensation with polyamines: I. Spectroscopic studies". Journal of Molecular Biology. 121 (3): 311–326. doi:10.1016/0022-2836(78)90366-2. ISSN 0022-2836. PMID 671540.
- Gosule, Leonard C.; Schellman, John A. (January 1976). "Compact form of DNA induced by spermidine". Nature. 259 (5541): 333–335. Bibcode:1976Natur.259..333G. doi:10.1038/259333a0. ISSN 1476-4687. PMID 1250371. S2CID 4159793.
- Schellman, John A. (May 1975). "Macromolecular binding". Biopolymers. 14 (5): 999–1018. doi:10.1002/bip.1975.360140509. ISSN 0006-3525. S2CID 221464222.
- Schellman, John A. (June 1, 1975). "Circular dichroism and optical rotation". Chemical Reviews. 75 (3): 323–331. doi:10.1021/cr60295a004. ISSN 0009-2665.
- Schellman, J.A.; Harrington, W.F. (1956). "Evidence for the instability of hydrogen-bonded peptide structures in water, based on studies of ribonuclease and oxidized ribonuclease. Comptes Rendus des Travaux du Laboratoire Carlsberg.". Serie Chimique. 30 (3): 21–43. PMID 13343781 – via Europe PMC.

== Awards, honors ==
- 1959–1963 Sloan Fellow
- 1962–1967 BBC Study Section of NIH
- 1969–1970 Guggenheim Fellow, Department of Chemical Physics, Weizmann Institute, Rehovot, Israel
- 1982 Elected to the National Academy of Sciences
- 1983 American Physical Society Fellow, cited For the application of rigorous physical theory and the development of novel experimental techniques to increase our understanding of the structure and behavior of biological macromolecules, especially proteins and nucleic acids.
- 1983 Member, American Academy of Arts and Sciences
- 1983 Honorary Doctorate, Chalmers University, Sweden
- 1986 Chalmers 150th Anniversary Professorship, Chalmers University, Gothenburg, Sweden
- 1990 Honorary Doctorate, University of Padua, Italy
- 2001 Fellow, Biophysical Society
