= Ever Since Darwin =

1977 essay collection by Stephen Jay Gould

Ever Since Darwin: Reflections in Natural History
- First edition (US)
- Author: Stephen Jay Gould
- Cover artist: Jay J. Smith
- Publisher: W. W. Norton (US); Penguin Books (UK)
- Publication date: 1977
- Media type: Print (hardcover and paperback)
- Pages: 285
- ISBN: 978-0393064254
- OCLC: 3090189
- Dewey Decimal: 575.01/62
- LC Class: QH361 .G65 1977
- Followed by: The Panda's Thumb

Ever Since Darwin is a 1977 popular science book by the paleontologist Stephen Jay Gould. It collected 33 of his essays, all of which had appeared in his monthly column, "This View of Life", in Natural History magazine.

The essays cover a wide range of topics including the career of Charles Darwin, his theory of natural selection, its various misinterpretations over the prior century, and some observations on science itself. Ever Since Darwin became a best seller and propelled Gould to national prominence. It was the first of ten essay collections by him to be published over the next 25 years.

== Synopsis ==
In the Prologue, after summarizing the tenets of natural selection, Gould lists three reasons why this "apparently simple theory" has been hard for people to accept:

First, Darwin argues that evolution has no purpose. Individuals struggle to increase the representation of their genes in future generations, and that is all. If the world displays any harmony and order, it arises only as an incidental result of individuals seeking their own advantage.... Second, Darwin maintained that evolution has no direction; it does not lead inevitably to higher things. Organisms become better adapted to their local environments, and that is all. The "degeneracy" of a parasite is as perfect as the gait of a gazelle. Third, Darwin applied a consistent philosophy of materialism to his interpretation of nature. Matter is the ground of all existence; mind, spirit, and God as well, are just words that express the wondrous results of neuronal complexity.

Gould asserts that because Darwinism banished belief in "purpose, direction and spirit", along with the belief that humans were meant to have control over the earth through a preordained process, "the world has been different ever since Darwin. But no less exciting, instructing, or uplifting; for if we cannot find purpose in nature, we will have to define it for ourselves."

In the opening essay, "Darwin's Delay", Gould recounts how Darwin conceived the theory of natural selection in 1838 after reading Thomas Malthus on Population, but did not publish The Origin of Species until 1859. Gould hypothesizes that the lengthy delay was at least partly driven by fear. As a young man of 29 in 1838, Darwin recognized he had stumbled on a heresy, that his theory, with its basis in philosophical materialism, had eliminated the need for God in evolution. Darwin "was not about to compromise a promising career by promulgating a heresy that he could not prove."

The "Odd Organisms and Evolutionary Exemplars" section contains essays about unusual species traits—such as the freshwater Lampsilis mussels which evolved a decoy fish on their rear end, and the gall midges which eat their mothers from inside—that highlight the "apparent senselessness" of certain adaptations, and sow doubt about the perfectibility of evolutionary design. Gould retells the history of the Irish Elk, one of the largest ever deer species. According to the fossil record, the male's antlers grew to 12 feet in size and weighed 90 pounds. The elk went extinct in Ireland over 10,000 years ago. Gould notes how anti-Darwinians argued that natural selection cannot account for a trait like the elk's giant antlers (presumed to be useful strictly as weapons in combat) that becomes so exaggerated, it no longer offers survival benefit. But Gould suggests the antlers were used for display more than combat, to establish "hierarchies of dominance", and they conferred high status and access to females. He further suggests that the Irish Elk's extinction was likely due to the onset of a cold epoch, and the organism's failure to adapt quickly enough to the loss of grassy, open country: "Darwinian evolution decrees that no animal shall actively develop a harmful structure, but it offers no guarantee that useful structures will continue to be adaptive in changed circumstances."

Several of the book's essays deal with the intersection of politics and science, for example, in "Racism and Recapitulation", Gould chronicles the rise and fall of "recapitulation theory", which posited that organisms "replay their evolution in their embryonic growth, so that one could read in the development of a fetus the history of its lineage." He explains how this theory was used to promote the racist notion that blacks were inferior because they retained juvenile traits. He also criticizes biological determinism and sociobiology for defending "existing social arrangements as biologically inevitable" while lacking, in his view, supporting scientific evidence.

== Background ==
In a 1999 tribute to Gould, Edwin Barber recalled the origins of Ever Since Darwin:

In 1974 I was a new editor at W. W. Norton and blessed by being able to spend hours in the New York Public Library. There I first came across Natural History and read an essay entitled "Size and Shape".... That afternoon I wrote to Steve about the piece – his first column, it turned out, under the rubric "This View of Life".... "What's a smart fellow like you doing with no books in print?", I asked.... Soon after, I signed Steve to write The Mismeasure of Man. Not until three years later when Steve had 33 columns under his belt did it occur to either of us that the Natural History pieces should be gathered between hard covers.

The 33 columns became Ever Since Darwin and led to nine more collections of Gould's essays being published before his death in 2002.

== Reception ==
In the Chicago Tribune, David Walsten called Gould's book "a remarkable achievement by any measure. He is profoundly intelligent, a writer of great natural wit, and his sophistication and learning range far beyond the parameters of his academic field, biology.... One is hard pressed to single out past writers who could wear the sobriquet of natural history essayist with such distinction."

The same year that Ever Since Darwin was released, Gould also published his first technical book on biology, Ontogeny and Phylogeny. As American evolutionary biologist H. Allen Orr later wrote, "Though both received good notices, it was, more than anything, their simultaneity that turned heads. Scientists do not as a rule burst upon the popular and the professional scenes at the same moment." Orr observed how The New York Times gave a rave review to "Gould's double debut, and he was off and running." Orr was referring to James Gorman's laudatory remarks in the Times, stating at one point that Gould "not only explains scientific theory but comments on science itself, with clarity and wit, simultaneously entertaining and teaching."

In a review of Ever Since Darwin in the British journal Nature, Richard Dawkins noted Gould's "useful trick of first opening the reader's mind by boggling it, then filling it with the biological principle." Regarding the book's Epilogue—which discusses the question, "Where is Darwinism going?"—Dawkins said it whetted his appetite for another volume of Gould's essays, as indeed there would be many more.

W. W. Norton estimated that Ever Since Darwin sold a quarter million copies. The book briefly appeared on The New York Times best seller list in December 1977.
