= The Flamingo's Smile =

1985 essay collection by Stephen Jay Gould

- Cover of the first edition
- Author: Stephen Jay Gould
- Language: English
- Publisher: W. W. Norton
- Publication date: 1985
- Publication place: United States
- Media type: Print
- Pages: 476
- ISBN: 0393022285
- LC Class: QH81 .G673 1985
- Preceded by: Hen's Teeth and Horse's Toes
- Followed by: Bully for Brontosaurus

The Flamingo's Smile: Reflections in Natural History, published in 1985, is the fourth volume of essays from evolutionary biologist and popular science writer Stephen Jay Gould. The essays were collected from his monthly column in Natural History magazine, and address subjects familiar to Gould's readers: evolution and its teaching, science biography, taxonomy and classification, and the development of biology, including the errors of the past. As in his 1980 collection The Panda's Thumb, Gould highlights in The Flamingo's Smile the role of happenstance in the adaptation of life forms.

== Synopsis ==
In the Prologue, Gould lists recurring themes in his Natural History columns:

[T]he meaning of pattern in life's history (partly random and, in any case, not designed for us or towards us); the social implications of scientific assaults upon pervasive biases of Western thought.... At the center stands the one theme that transcends even evolution itself in generality—the nature of history. The Flamingo's Smile is about history and what it means to say that life is the product of a contingent past, not the inevitable and predictable result of simple, timeless laws of nature. Quirkiness and meaning are my two not-so-contradictory themes.

In the title essay, he begins by observing that flamingos developed a rare behavior, unique among birds, of feeding with their heads upside down. He then explains that in evolution, behavioral change precedes physical change: "Darwin's theory, as a statement about adaptation to immediate environments...predicts that form should follow function to establish good fit for peculiar life styles. In short, we might suspect that the flamingo's upper bill, working functionally as a lower jaw, would evolve to approximate, or even mimic, the usual form of a bird's lower jaw (and vice versa for the anatomical lower, and functionally upper, beak). Has such a change occurred?" He answers in the affirmative and itemizes the alterations in flamingo morphology that evolved as a consequence of the mode of feeding, including the appearance of an enigmatic smile when a drawing or photo of a flamingo is viewed upside down.

Throughout the book, Gould emphasizes that an organism's pre-existing structure limits what evolutionary changes are possible because "Natural selection, as a historical process, can only work with material available.... The resulting imperfections and odd solutions, cobbled together from parts on hand, record a process that unfolds in time from unsuited antecedents, not the work of a perfect architect creating ab nihilo."

According to Gould, the evolutionary oddities he describes actually serve to confirm Darwin's theory of natural selection, rather than disprove it:

Our world is not an optimal place, fine tuned by omnipotent forces of selection. It is a quirky mass of imperfections, working well enough (often admirably); a jury-rigged set of adaptations built of curious parts made available by past histories in different contexts. Darwin, who was a keen student of history, not just a devotee of selection, understood this principle as the primary proof of evolution itself.

Gould frequently displays his wit and erudition when explaining biological facts, for example, when discussing sexual cannibalism and the copulatory practices of the black widow spider, he writes: "The male, blessed with paired organs for transferring sperm, inserts one palp, then, if not yet attacked by the female, the other. Hungry females may then gobble up their mates, completing the double-entendre of a consummation devoutly to be wished."

The Flamingo's Smile ranges over a wide array of topics, including dinosaur extinction, SETI, the Omphalos hypothesis, flowers and snails that change gender, Siamese twins and whether they are one person or two, the importance of taxonomy, and the disappearance of the .400 hitter in baseball.

== Background ==
Of the 30 essays in the collection, 26 were culled from Gould's Natural History column, "This View of Life", during the years 1983 to 1985. In the book's Prologue, he announces that he recently completed his hundredth column for the magazine; he would end up writing three hundred columns between January 1974 and January 2001. The book's remaining four essays originally appeared in other publications, specifically,The New York Times, Vanity Fair, and Discover.

== Reception ==
The book received positive reviews in the mainstream press and in science journals. In Newsday, David Laurence said of Gould: "No writer explains the meaning and far-ranging implications of evolution more ably, makes his subject more fun, or shows a greater sense of the scientist's responsibility to his subject and to the public at large." The Plain Dealer lauded Gould for his willingness to explore the darker side of science, such as the unnecessary "eugenic" sterilization of Carrie Buck in 20th-century Virginia, and the racist exhibition of the "Hottentot Venus", a Bushman woman, in the early 19th century.

In The New York Review of Books, Frank Sulloway commended Gould for recognizing, as did Darwin, that proofs of evolution are "just those instances where imperfection betrays the historical process by which some structure was acquired." Sulloway added that Gould's criticism in The Flamingo's Smile of the "adaptationist program" within current evolutionary biology was "rooted in his conviction that history, which is full of evidence of structural constraints and other peculiarities defying optimal development, must not be forgotten in evolutionary explanations."

When comparing The Flamingo's Smile against the author's three previous essay collections, John Updike claimed in The New Yorker that the latest volume had a "mellowed" tone, "more appreciative than assertive. A number of its essays sympathetically explicate retrospectively preposterous scientific theories and patiently explain how learned and honorable men could hold them."

In British Medical Journal, Michael O'Donnell singled out Gould's essay profiling Alfred Kinsey, and how it informed us that Kinsey was once a leading taxonomist of wasps before his more famous research on human sexuality. In The Quarterly Review of Biology, Bentley Glass wrote, "The marvel of Gould's mind is the seemingly inexhaustible store of erudite knowledge that he can draw upon and ingeniously relate to his subject of the moment. Yet always his essay is so clear that any educated person can read it and understand. To follow his rambles through biology is to experience a rare pleasure."

In The New York Times review, David Quammen praised the book's intellectual content:

Stephen Jay Gould knows the value of using vivid particulars to communicate abstract scientific ideas. When he writes about such biological oddities as the inverted jellyfish Cassiopea, the praying mantis's mating habits, the giant panda's extra "thumb" or the flamingo's inverted jaw, he does so with a double purpose – to entertain us with fascinating details while teaching us a few general concepts. Every oddity he describes stands on its own as a discrete fact of nature, an individual mystery, as well as yielding an example of some broader principle. This lively approach – "letting generality cascade out of particulars", in his own words – is displayed again in his latest collection of essays, The Flamingo's Smile.

But Quammen faulted the book's writing style. After characterizing Gould's tone as "chatty and informal", Quammen added: "Of course a chatty and informal tone is not to be confused with graceful writing. Graceful these essays are not - there are too many digressions and flat-footed reiterations, too little concern for pace and rhythm and economy and polish. For all the precision of his thought and his research, his syntax and language are sometimes confoundingly imprecise."
