= Eight Little Piggies =

1993 book by Stephen Jay Gould

- Author: Stephen Jay Gould
- Publisher: W. W. Norton & Co.
- Publication date: 1993
- Media type: Print
- Pages: 479
- ISBN: 0-393-03416-X
- OCLC: 25916011
- Dewey Decimal: 575/.001 20
- LC Class: QH45.5 .G7 1993
- Preceded by: Bully for Brontosaurus
- Followed by: Dinosaur in a Haystack

Eight Little Piggies (1993) is the sixth volume of collected essays by the Harvard paleontologist Stephen Jay Gould. The essays were selected from his monthly column "The View of Life" in Natural History magazine, to which Gould contributed for 27 years. The book covers topics that are common to Gould's writing in a discursive manner, including evolution and its teaching, science biography, probabilities, and common sense.

The title essay, "Eight Little Piggies", is a thought piece on the prevalence of five digits on hands and feet throughout the animal kingdom. It also explores concepts such as archetypes and polydactyly via the anatomy of early tetrapods.

Other essays discuss themes such as the scale of extinction, vertebrate anatomy, grand patterns of evolution, and human nature.
