= Steve Blinkhorn =

British psychologist

Stephen F. Blinkhorn, CPsychol, FBPsS (born 1949) is a British occupational psychologist and psychometrician (based in Hertfordshire), who continues to contribute to psychology and psychometric testing.

Blinkhorn is known for publishing a number of papers, many of which have taken the form of book reviews for Nature magazine, including: 'Willow, Titwillow, Titwillow' (a review of Herrnstein and Murray's The Bell Curve); 'What skulduggery?' (a review of Stephen Jay Gould's 'The Mismeasure of Man'); and 'A gender bender' (a critique on Paul Irwing and Richard Lynn's paper on sex and intelligence). Other papers have argued about the inappropriate use of the Rasch model, and the misuse of personality tests.

== Life and career ==
After attending grammar school, Blinkhorn went up to St Edmund Hall, Oxford.

=== Academia ===
From 1973 to 1987, he developed and ran one of the first postgraduate studies in Occupational Psychology (in Britain) at what was then Hatfield Polytechnic, now the University of Hertfordshire. During this time, he also spent a year as a visiting professor in the neurological laboratory at Stanford University, California (1981–1982).

On his return from Stanford, Blinkhorn was approached by nferNelson (NFER's publishing arm) to design new ranges of tests for occupational selection. This led to the formation of the Psychometric Research Unit at Hatfield, which in turn was privatised by Dr. Blinkhorn in 1985.

=== Psychology and psychometrics ===
Blinkhorn has been responsible for some of the most widely used ability and aptitude tests for recruitment and selection. He is also known as a critic of bad testing practice, in particular the abuse of personality tests (see papers). At the age of 37, he became one of the then youngest fellows of the British Psychological Society. He has been a member of the BPS's Test Standards Committee, and served on the Society's Fellowships Committee. He is one of three consulting editors for Selection & Development Review (SDR) (published by the BPS) alongside Victor Dulewicz and Neil Anderson.

Blinkhorn was also a member of the panel formed by the BPS to investigate the polygraph and contributed a chapter to the book The Polygraph Test (1988), which resulted from the investigation.

As an expert witness, he has acted on behalf of the Commission for Racial Equality in several industrial tribunals.

He has worked with Harvey Goldstein (on the inappropriate implementation of the Rasch model in education), and was involved with the development of National Vocational Qualifications.

Blinkhorn also contributed a chapter in Cyril Burt: Fraud or Framed? and 'Was Burt stitched up?' in Nature magazine. More recently followed by 'There's no-one quite like Grandad' (Blinkhorn's speech at the Lighthill institute of mathematical sciences, Dec 2006) on newly rediscovered evidence which cast 'fresh light on early developments of mathematics applied to psychology' including references to Charles Spearman's original work on general intelligence, and also to J.C. Maxwell Garnett, Cyril Burt, Godfrey Thomson, and Louis Thurstone.

=== Nature articles ===
Since 1980, Blinkhorn has been writing for Nature, starting with a book review of Arthur Jensen's Bias in Mental Testing. Steve Blinkhorn has written a number of articles, some of which have been on controversial issues: Gender and IQ ('Gender Bender'); Vitamin Pills and IQ ('A dose of Vitamins and a Pinch of salt'); Mice and IQ ('Mice and Mentality'); 'Exponent of the exponential' (a review of Thomas Blass' The man who shocked the world: the life and legacy of Stanley Milgram). Other articles such as Yes, but what's it for? discusses how the current state of language makes it difficult to discuss evolution accurately.

In 2003, Blinkhorn was listed among Nature's 'magnificent seven' (writers commended for writing outstanding articles, illustrating 'the great job that scientists can do in communicating and commenting on new research'. Others included David Wark, Philip N Benfey, S. Blair Hedges, John Harte, Toren Finzel and Len A.Fisk.
