= The Mismeasure of Man =

1981 book by Stephen Jay Gould

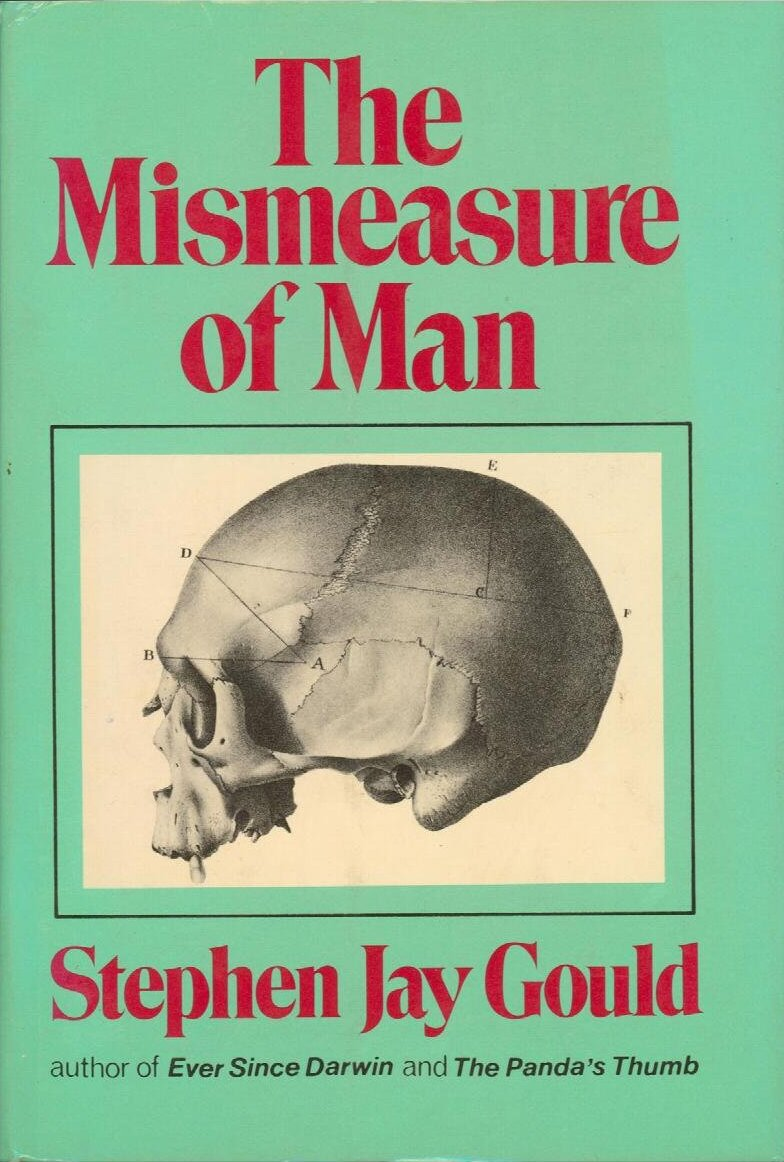
- Cover of the first edition
- Author: Stephen Jay Gould
- Language: English
- Subjects: Ability testing, Craniometry, Intelligence tests, Personality tests, Racism, Social science
- Publisher: W. W. Norton & Company
- Publication date: 1981, 1996
- Publication place: United States
- Media type: Print (hardcover and paperback)
- Pages: 352
- ISBN: 0-393-01489-4
- OCLC: 7574615
- Preceded by: The Panda's Thumb
- Followed by: Hen's Teeth and Horse's Toes

The Mismeasure of Man is a 1981 book by paleontologist Stephen Jay Gould. The book is both a history and critique of the statistical methods and cultural motivations underlying biological determinism, the belief that "the social and economic differences between human groups—primarily races, classes, and sexes—arise from inherited, inborn distinctions and that society, in this sense, is an accurate reflection of biology".

Gould argues that the primary assumption underlying biological determinism is that "worth can be assigned to individuals and groups by measuring intelligence as a single quantity". Biological determinism is analyzed in discussions of craniometry and psychological testing, the two principal methods used to measure intelligence as a single quantity. According to Gould, these methods possess two deep fallacies. The first fallacy is reification, which is "our tendency to convert abstract concepts into entities". Examples of reification include the intelligence quotient (IQ) and the general intelligence factor (g factor), which have been the cornerstones of much research into human intelligence. The second fallacy is that of "ranking", which is the "propensity for ordering complex variation as a gradual ascending scale".

The book received many positive reviews in the literary and popular press, while scientific reception was highly polarized. Positive reviews focused on the book's critique of scientific racism, the concept of general intelligence, and biological determinism, while negative reviews criticised Gould's scientific arguments, historical accuracy, and political bias. The Mismeasure of Man won the National Book Critics Circle award. Gould's findings about how 19th-century researcher Samuel George Morton measured skull volumes were particularly controversial, inspiring several studies debating his claims.

In 1996, a second edition was released. It included two additional chapters critiquing Richard Herrnstein and Charles Murray's book The Bell Curve (1994).

== Author ==
Stephen Jay Gould (/ɡuːld/; 1941 – 2002) was a professor at Harvard, teaching paleontology, evolutionary biology, and the history of science. An active and prodigious author, Gould's work was frequently cited by colleagues, being both influential and sometimes polarizing. He was also among the best selling authors of popular science, with a broad global readership. As in The Mismeasure of Man, throughout his writings Gould regularly criticized biologically determined explanations for human behavior, as seen in his "Against Sociobiology" (1975) and "The Spandrels of San Marco and the Panglossian Paradigm" (1979).

== Summary ==
=== Craniometry ===
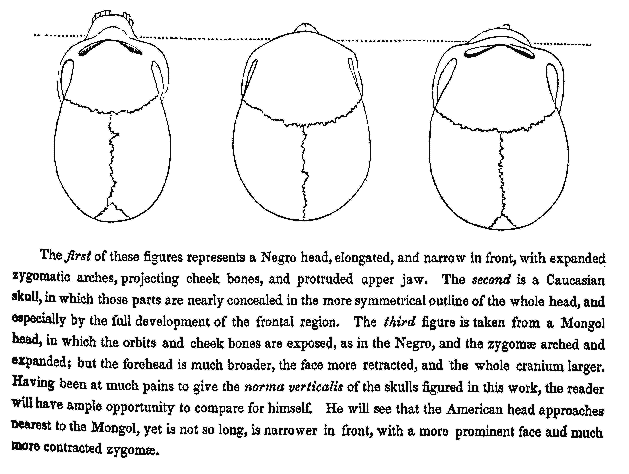
The "species" of man: "a Negro head . . . a Caucasian skull . . . a Mongol head", by S. G. Morton (1839)

The Mismeasure of Man is a critical analysis of the early works of scientific racism which promoted "the theory of unitary, innate, linearly rankable intelligence"—such as craniometry, the measurement of skull volume and its relation to intellectual faculties. Gould alleged that much of the research was based largely on racial and social prejudices of the researchers rather than their scientific objectivity; that on occasion, researchers such as Samuel George Morton (1799–1851), Louis Agassiz (1807–1873), and Paul Broca (1824–1880), committed the methodological fallacy of allowing their personal a priori expectations to influence their conclusions and analytical reasoning. Gould noted that when Morton switched from using bird seed, which was less reliable, to lead shot to obtain endocranial-volume data, the average skull volumes changed; however, these changes were not uniform across Morton's "racial" groupings. To Gould, it appeared that unconscious bias influenced Morton's initial results. Gould speculated,

Plausible scenarios are easy to construct. Morton, measuring by seed, picks up a threateningly large black skull, fills it lightly and gives it a few desultory shakes. Next, he takes a distressingly small Caucasian skull, shakes hard, and pushes mightily at the foramen magnum with his thumb. It is easily done, without conscious motivation; expectation is a powerful guide to action.

In 1977 Gould conducted his own analysis on some of Morton's endocranial-volume data, and alleged that the original results were based on a priori convictions and a selective use of data. He argued that when biases are accounted for, the original hypothesis—an ascending order of skull volume ranging from Blacks to Mongols to Whites—is unsupported by the data.

=== Bias and falsification ===
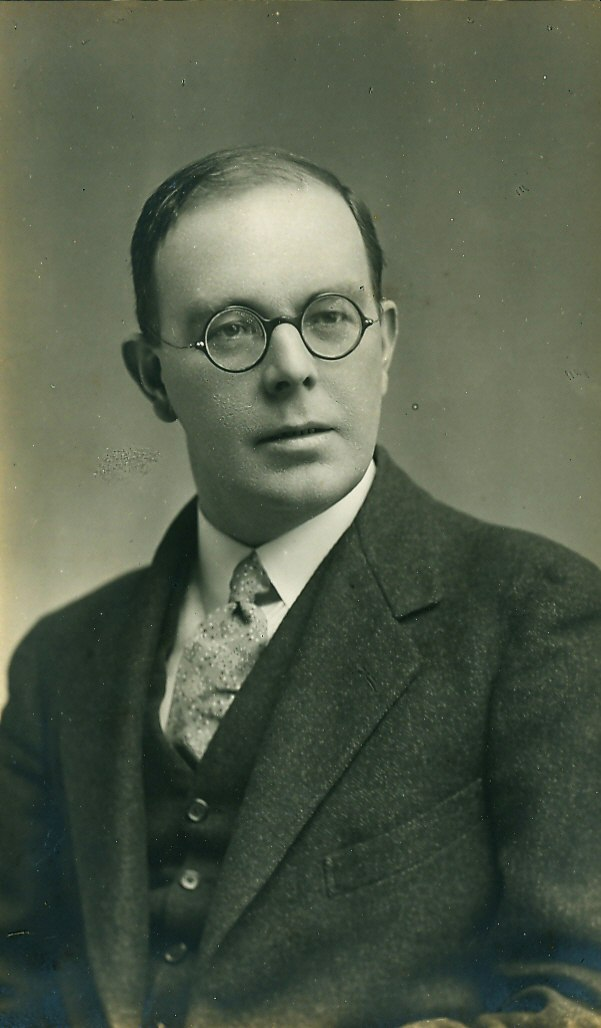
Gould cited Leon Kamin's study which argued that Cyril Burt (above) fabricated data.

The Mismeasure of Man presents a historical evaluation of the concepts of the intelligence quotient (IQ) and of the general intelligence factor (g factor), which were and are the measures for intelligence used by psychologists. Gould proposed that most psychological studies have been heavily biased, by the belief that the human behavior of a race of people is best explained by genetic heredity. He cites the Burt Affair, about the oft-cited twin studies, by Cyril Burt (1883–1971), wherein Burt claimed that human intelligence is highly heritable.

=== IQ, g, statistical correlation, and heritability ===
As an evolutionary biologist and historian of science, Gould accepted biological variability (the premise of the transmission of intelligence via genetic heredity), but opposed biological determinism, which posits that genes determine a definitive, unalterable social destiny for each man and each woman in life and society. The Mismeasure of Man is an analysis of statistical correlation, the mathematics applied by psychologists to establish the validity of IQ tests, and the heritability of intelligence. For example, to establish the validity of the proposition that IQ is supported by a general intelligence factor (g factor), the answers to several tests of cognitive ability must positively correlate; thus, for the g factor to be a heritable trait, the IQ-test scores of close-relation respondents must correlate more than the IQ-test scores of distant-relation respondents. However, correlation does not imply causation; for example, Gould said that the measures of the changes, over time, in "my age, the population of México, the price of Swiss cheese, my pet turtle's weight, and the average distance between galaxies" have a high, positive correlation—yet that correlation does not indicate that Gould's age increased because the Mexican population increased. More specifically, a high, positive correlation between the intelligence quotients of a parent and a child can be presumed either as evidence that IQ is genetically inherited, or that IQ is inherited through social and environmental factors. Moreover, because the data from IQ tests can be applied to arguing the logical validity of either proposition—genetic inheritance and environmental inheritance—the psychometric data have no inherent value.

Gould pointed out that if the genetic heritability of IQ were demonstrable within a given racial or ethnic group, it would not explain the causes of IQ differences among the people of a group, or if said IQ differences can be attributed to the environment. For example, the height of a person is genetically determined, but there exist height differences within a given social group that can be attributed to environmental factors (e.g. the quality of nutrition) and to genetic inheritance. The evolutionary biologist Richard Lewontin, a colleague of Gould's, is a proponent of this argument in relation to IQ tests. An example of the intellectual confusion about what heritability is and is not, is the statement: "If all environments were to become equal for everyone, heritability would rise to 100 percent because all remaining differences in IQ would necessarily be genetic in origin", which Gould said is misleading, at best, and false, at worst. First, it is very difficult to conceive of a world wherein every man, woman, and child grew up in the same environment, because their spatial and temporal dispersion upon the planet Earth makes it impossible. Second, were people to grow up in the same environment, not every difference would be genetic in origin because of the randomness of molecular and genetic development. Therefore, heritability is not a measure of phenotypic (physiognomy and physique) differences among racial and ethnic groups, but of differences between genotype and phenotype in a given population.

Furthermore, he dismissed the proposition that an IQ score measures the general intelligence (g factor) of a person, because cognitive ability tests (IQ tests) present different types of questions, and the responses tend to form clusters of intellectual acumen. That is, different questions, and the answers to them, yield different scores—which indicate that an IQ test is a combination method of different examinations of different things. As such, Gould proposed that IQ-test proponents assume the existence of "general intelligence" as a discrete quality within the human mind, and thus they analyze the IQ-test data to produce an IQ number that establishes the definitive general intelligence of each man and of each woman. Hence, Gould dismissed the IQ number as an erroneous artifact of the statistical mathematics applied to the raw IQ-test data, especially because psychometric data can be variously analyzed to produce multiple IQ scores.

=== Second edition ===
The revised and expanded second edition (1996) includes two additional chapters, which critique Richard Herrnstein and Charles Murray's book The Bell Curve (1994). Gould maintains that their book contains no new arguments and presents no compelling data; it merely refashions earlier arguments for biological determinism, which Gould defines as "the abstraction of intelligence as a single entity, its location within the brain, its quantification as one number for each individual, and the use of these numbers to rank people in a single series of worthiness, invariably to find that oppressed and disadvantaged groups—races, classes, or sexes—are innately inferior and deserve their status".

== Reception ==
=== Praise ===
Gould wrote that the majority of reviews of The Mismeasure of Man were positive. Gould's colleague Richard Lewontin, a celebrated evolutionary biologist who held positions at both the University of Chicago and Harvard, wrote a glowing review of Gould's book in The New York Review of Books, endorsing most aspects of its account, and suggesting that it might have been even more critical of the racist intentions of the scientists he discusses, because scientists "sometimes tell deliberate lies because they believe that small lies can serve big truths." Gould said that the most positive review of the first edition to be written by a psychologist was in the British Journal of Mathematical & Statistical Psychology, which reported that "Gould has performed a valuable service in exposing the logical basis of one of the most important debates in the social sciences, and this book should be required reading for students and practitioners alike." In The New York Times, journalist Christopher Lehmann-Haupt wrote that the critique of factor analysis "demonstrates persuasively how factor analysis led to the cardinal error in reasoning, of confusing correlation with cause, or, to put it another way, of attributing false concreteness to the abstract". The British journal Saturday Review praised the book as a "fascinating historical study of scientific racism", and that its arguments "illustrate both the logical inconsistencies of the theories and the prejudicially motivated, albeit unintentional, misuse of data in each case". In the American Monthly Review magazine, Richard York and the sociologist Brett Clark praised the book's thematic concentration, saying that "rather than attempt a grand critique of all 'scientific' efforts aimed at justifying social inequalities, Gould performs a well-reasoned assessment of the errors underlying a specific set of theories and empirical claims". Newsweek gave it a positive review for revealing biased science and its abuse. The Atlantic Monthly and Phi Beta Kappa's The Key Reporter also reviewed the book favorably.

=== Awards ===
The first edition of The Mismeasure of Man won the non-fiction award from the National Book Critics Circle; the Outstanding Book Award for 1983 from the American Educational Research Association; the Italian translation was awarded the Iglesias prize in 1991; and in 1998, the Modern Library ranked it as the 24th-best English-language non-fiction book of the 20th century. In December 2006, Discover magazine ranked The Mismeasure of Man as the 17th-greatest science book of all time.

=== Reassessing Morton's skull measurements ===
In a paper published in 1988, John S. Michael reported that Samuel G. Morton's original 19th-century study was conducted with less bias than Gould had described; that "contrary to Gould's interpretation ... Morton's research was conducted with integrity". Nonetheless, Michael's analysis suggested that there were discrepancies in Morton's craniometric calculations, that his data tables were scientifically unsound, and he "cannot be excused for his errors, or his unfair comparisons of means". Michael later complained that some authors, including J. Philippe Rushton, selectively "cherry-picked facts" from his research to support their own claims. He lamented, "Some people have turned the Morton-Gould affair into an all or nothing debate in which either one side is right or the other side is right, and I think that is a mistake. Both men made mistakes and proving one wrong does not prove the other one right."

In another study, published in 2011, Jason E. Lewis and colleagues re-measured the cranial volumes of the skulls in Morton's collection, and re-examined the respective statistical analyses by Morton and by Gould, concluding that, contrary to Gould's analysis, Morton did not falsify craniometric research results to support his racial and social prejudices, and that the "Caucasians" possessed the greatest average cranial volume in the sample. To the extent that Morton's craniometric measurements were erroneous, the error was away from his personal biases. Ultimately, Lewis and colleagues disagreed with most of Gould's criticisms of Morton, finding that Gould's work was "poorly supported", and that, in their opinion, the confirmation of the results of Morton's original work "weakens the argument of Gould, and others, that biased results are endemic in science". Lewis' study examined 46% of Morton's samples, whereas Gould's earlier study was based solely on a reexamination of Morton's raw data tables. However Lewis' study was subsequently criticized by a number of scholars for misrepresenting Gould's claims, bias, faulted for examining fewer than half of the skulls in Morton's collection, for failing to correct measurements for age, gender or stature, and for its claim that any meaningful conclusions could be drawn from Morton's data.

In 2015 this paper was reviewed by Michael Weisberg, who reported that "most of Gould's arguments against Morton are sound. Although Gould made some errors and overstated his case in a number of places, he provided prima facie evidence, as yet unrefuted, that Morton did indeed mismeasure his skulls in ways that conformed to 19th century racial biases". Biologists and philosophers Jonathan Kaplan, Massimo Pigliucci, and Joshua Alexander Banta also published a critique of the group's paper, arguing that many of its claims were misleading and the re-measurements were "completely irrelevant to an evaluation of Gould's published analysis". They also maintain that the "methods deployed by Morton and Gould were both inappropriate" and that "Gould's statistical analysis of Morton's data is in many ways no better than Morton's own".

A 2018 paper argued that Morton's interpretation of the data was biased but that the data itself was accurate. The paper argued that Morton's measurements were similar to those of a contemporary craniologist, Friedrich Tiedemann, who had interpreted the data differently to argue strongly against any conception of racial hierarchy.

=== Criticism ===
In a review of The Mismeasure of Man, Bernard Davis, professor of microbiology at Harvard Medical School, said that Gould erected a straw man argument based upon incorrectly defined key terms—specifically reification—which Gould furthered with a "highly selective" presentation of statistical data, all motivated more by politics than by science. Davis said that Philip Morrison's laudatory book review of The Mismeasure of Man in Scientific American was written and published because the editors of the journal had "long seen the study of the genetics of intelligence as a threat to social justice". Davis also criticized the popular-press and the literary-journal book reviews of The Mismeasure of Man as generally approbatory; whereas, he said that most scientific-journal book reviews were generally critical. Davis accused Gould of having misrepresented a study by Henry H. Goddard (1866–1957) about the intelligence of Jewish, Hungarian, Italian, and Russian immigrants to the U.S., wherein Gould reported Goddard's qualifying those people as "feeble-minded"; whereas, in the initial sentence of the study, Goddard said the study subjects were atypical members of their ethnic groups, who had been selected because of their suspected sub-normal intelligence. Davis also argued that Goddard had proposed that the low IQs of the sub-normally intelligent men and women who took the cognitive-ability test likely derived from their social environments rather than from their respective genetic inheritances, and concluded that "we may be confident that their children will be of average intelligence, and, if rightly brought up, will be good citizens". Gould pushed back against some of Davis' claims in a 1994 revised edition of the book. While Davis characterized the book's reception as negative in the scientific journals, Gould argued that of twenty-four academic book reviews written by experts in psychology, fourteen approved, three were mixed opinions, and seven disapproved of the book.

In his review, psychologist John B. Carroll said that Gould did not understand "the nature and purpose" of factor analysis. Statistician David J. Bartholomew, of the London School of Economics, said that Gould erred in his use of factor analysis, irrelevantly concentrated upon the fallacy of reification (abstract as concrete), and ignored the contemporary scientific consensus about the existence of the psychometric g.

Reviewing the book, Stephen F. Blinkhorn, a senior lecturer in psychology at the University of Hertfordshire, wrote that The Mismeasure of Man was "a masterpiece of propaganda" that selectively juxtaposed data to further a political agenda. Psychologist Lloyd Humphreys, then editor-in-chief of The American Journal of Psychology and Psychological Bulletin, wrote that The Mismeasure of Man was "science fiction" and "political propaganda", and that Gould had misrepresented the views of Alfred Binet, Godfrey Thomson, and Lewis Terman.

In his review, psychologist Franz Samelson wrote that Gould was wrong in asserting that the psychometric results of the intelligence tests administered to soldier-recruits by the U.S. Army contributed to the legislation of the Immigration Restriction Act of 1924. In their study of the Congressional Record and committee hearings related to the Immigration Act, Mark Snyderman and Richard J. Herrnstein reported that "the [intelligence] testing community did not generally view its findings as favoring restrictive immigration policies like those in the 1924 Act, and Congress took virtually no notice of intelligence testing".d

A 2019 paper argued that Gould was incorrect in his assessment of the Army Beta and that, for the knowledge, technology and test development standards of the time, it was adequate and could measure intelligence, possibly even in the modern day.

=== Responses by subjects of the book ===
In his review of The Mismeasure of Man, Arthur Jensen, a University of California (Berkeley) educational psychologist whom Gould much criticized in the book, wrote that Gould used straw man arguments to advance his opinions, misrepresented other scientists, and propounded a political agenda. According to Jensen, the book was "a patent example" of the bias that political ideology imposes upon science—the very thing that Gould sought to portray in the book. Jensen also criticized Gould for concentrating on long-disproven arguments (noting that 71% of the book's references preceded 1950), rather than addressing "anything currently regarded as important by scientists in the relevant fields", suggesting that drawing conclusions from early human intelligence research is like condemning the contemporary automobile industry based upon the mechanical performance of the Ford Model T.

Charles Murray, co-author of The Bell Curve (1994), said that his views about the distribution of human intelligence, among the races and the ethnic groups who compose the U.S. population, were misrepresented in The Mismeasure of Man.

Psychologist Hans Eysenck wrote that The Mismeasure of Man is a book that presents "a paleontologist's distorted view of what psychologists think, untutored in even the most elementary facts of the science".

=== Responses to the second edition (1996) ===
Arthur Jensen and Bernard Davis argued that if the g factor (general intelligence factor) were replaced with a model that tested several types of intelligence, it would change results less than one might expect. Therefore, according to Jensen and Davis, the results of standardized tests of cognitive ability would continue to correlate with the results of other such standardized tests, and that the intellectual achievement gap between black and white people would remain.

James R. Flynn, a researcher critical of racial theories of intelligence, repeated the arguments of Arthur Jensen about the second edition of The Mismeasure of Man. Flynn wrote that "Gould's book evades all of Jensen's best arguments for a genetic component in the black–white IQ gap, by positing that they are dependent on the concept of g as a general intelligence factor. Therefore, Gould believes that if he can discredit g no more need be said. This is manifestly false. Jensen's arguments would bite no matter whether blacks suffered from a score deficit on one or ten or one hundred factors." Rather than defending Jensen and Rushton, however, Flynn concluded that the Flynn Effect, a nongenetic rise in IQ throughout the 20th century, invalidated their core argument because their methods falsely identified even this change as genetic.

According to psychologist Ian Deary, Gould's claim that there is no relation between brain size and IQ is outdated. Furthermore, he reported that Gould refused to correct this in new editions of the book, even though newly available data were brought to his attention by several researchers.

== See also ==
- Intelligence quotient
- History of the race and intelligence controversy
- Scientific racism
