= Questioning the Millennium =

1997 book by Stephen Jay Gould

- Author: Stephen Jay Gould
- Language: English
- Publisher: Harmony Books
- Publication date: 1997; 2nd ed. 1999
- Publication place: United States
- Media type: Print, e-book
- Pages: 224 pp.
- ISBN: 0-609-60541-0
- OCLC: 42258219
- Preceded by: Full House
- Followed by: Leonardo's Mountain of Clams and the Diet of Worms

Questioning the Millennium is a 1997 book by the paleontologist Stephen Jay Gould that deals with the definition and calculation of the millennium, and its meaning in Western culture. New York Times reviewer Robert Eisner described it as a "slim and attractive meditation," which touches upon calendrics, Biblical exegesis, millennial cults, and includes "a charming essay on a young autistic man whose amazing ability to calculate instantly which day of the week coincided with any date mentioned over many centuries". Gould reveals that this young man was his autistic son, Jesse.

Michiko Kakutani wrote that while not one of Gould's more important books, Questioning the Millennium "beguiles and entertains, even as it teaches us to reconsider our preconceptions about the natural world." Kakutani noted that its subject was much broader than simply the millennium, encompassing the human love for order and regularity.

== Multimedia ==
- "Questioning the Millennium" - interview with Gould on Charlie Rose
- "Questioning the Millenium" - interview with Gould on All Things Considered
