= Bully for Brontosaurus =

1991 book by Stephen Jay Gould

- Cover of the first edition
- Author: Stephen Jay Gould
- Language: English
- Subject: Natural history
- Publisher: W. W. Norton & Co.
- Publication date: 1991
- Publication place: United States
- Media type: Print (hardcover and paperback)
- Pages: 540
- ISBN: 978-0-393-02961-1
- OCLC: 45338941
- Preceded by: The Flamingo's Smile
- Followed by: Eight Little Piggies

Bully for Brontosaurus (1991) is the fifth volume of collected essays by the Harvard paleontologist Stephen Jay Gould. The essays were culled from his monthly column "This View of Life" in Natural History magazine, to which Gould contributed for 27 years. The book deals, in typically discursive fashion, with themes familiar to Gould's writing: evolution and its teaching, science biography, and probabilities.

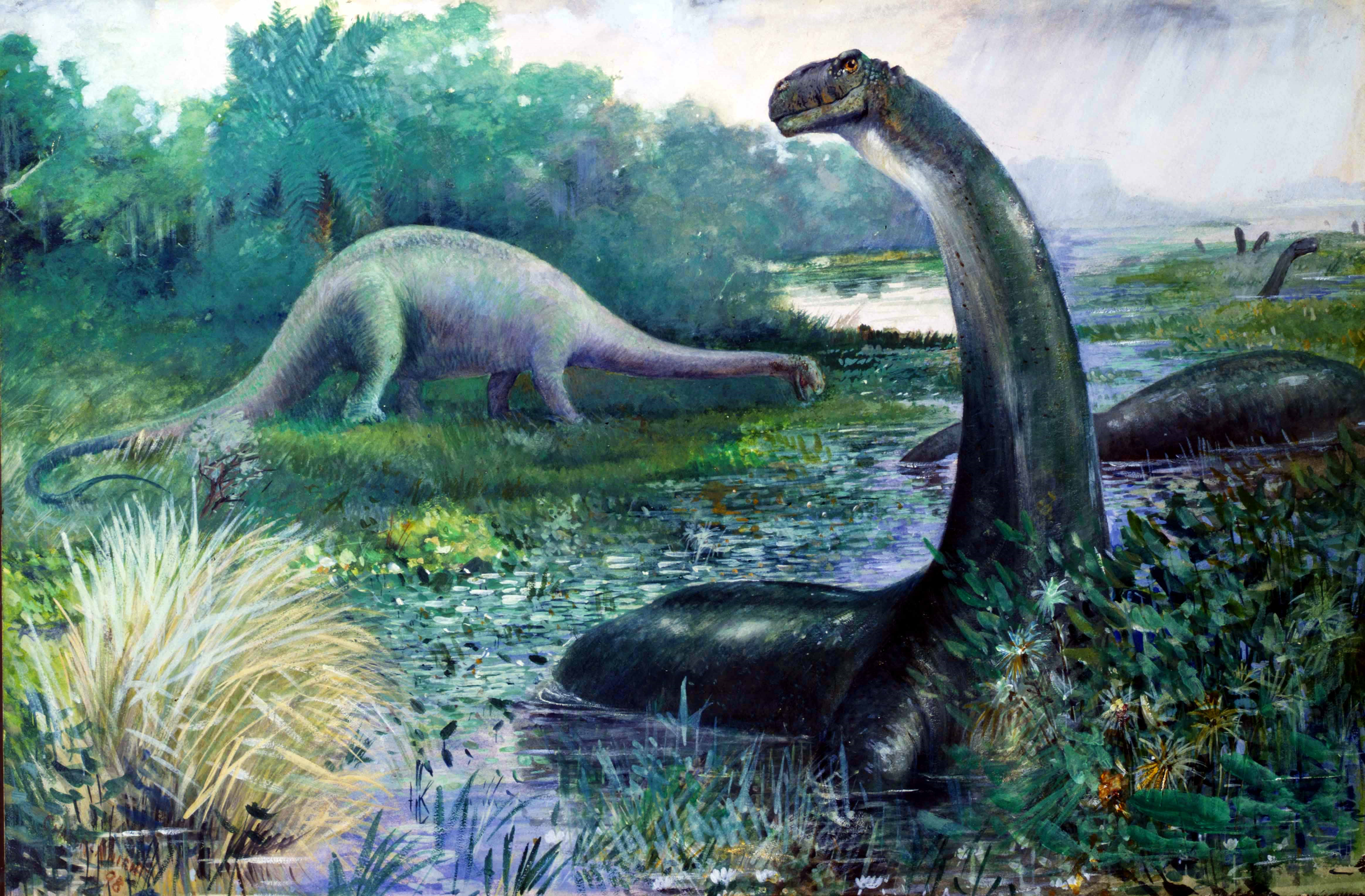
Brontosaurus restoration by Charles R. Knight which was used for the cover

The title essay, "Bully for Brontosaurus", discusses the theory and history of taxonomy by examining the debate over whether Brontosaurus should be labelled Apatosaurus. In "Justice Scalia's Misunderstanding", Gould dissects and decisively rejects Antonin Scalia's dissent in the United States Supreme Court case Edwards v. Aguillard that overturned the last creationist statute in the country. Gould claimed his favourite essay to be "In a Jumbled Drawer" which discusses the debate between Nathaniel Shaler and William James over whether the improbability of our having evolved necessitates divine intervention (Gould, like James, argues no); the essay includes a letter from former President Jimmy Carter as a postscript, which discusses the issue.

The essay "Male Nipples and Clitoral Ripples" dealt with the issue of adaptive arguments. It derives from some work by Elisabeth Lloyd, whose subsequent 2005 book was dedicated to Gould (and her parents), and uses the case of the female orgasm to expand on the subject of adaptiveness in both depth and breadth.

== Reception ==
A reviewer for Kirkus commended the author and his skill stating that the "essays are illuminating, instructive and fun to read." Publishers Weekly agreed on the account that the essays are "wonderful disquisitions."
