= Hen's Teeth and Horse's Toes =

Collection of essays by Stephen Jay Gould

- Author: Stephen Jay Gould
- Language: English
- Publisher: Norton
- Publication date: 1983
- Publication place: United States
- Media type: Print
- Pages: 413
- ISBN: 0393017168
- LC Class: QH366.2 .G66 1983
- Preceded by: The Panda's Thumb
- Followed by: The Flamingo's Smile

Hen's Teeth and Horse's Toes (1983) is Stephen Jay Gould's third volume of collected essays reprinted from his monthly columns for Natural History magazine titled "This View of Life".

Three essays appeared elsewhere. "Evolution as Fact and Theory" first appeared in Discover magazine in May 1981; "Phyletic size decrease in Hershey bars" appeared in C. J. Rubins's Junk Food, 1980; and his "Reply to Critics", was written specifically for this volume as a commentary upon criticism of essay 16, "The Piltdown Conspiracy".

== Awards ==
The book was awarded the 1983 Phi Beta Kappa Award for Science from the Phi Beta Kappa Society.
