= Rhonda Roland Shearer =

American sculptor and entrepreneur

- Born: 1954 (age 71–72)
- Occupations: Sculptor and journalist
- Organization: Art Science Research Laboratory
- Website: asrl.com toutfait.com imediaethics.org

Rhonda Roland Shearer is an American sculptor, art historian, and journalist noted for emergency relief work following the September 11 attacks and during the COVID-19 pandemic. In 1998, Shearer co-founded the Art Science Research Laboratory (ASRL) with her late husband, evolutionary theorist Stephen Jay Gould. As a sculptor, she has exhibited in New York City, Los Angeles, and London, as well as other U.S. cities. Her work has been published in art and science journals.

== Art Science Research Laboratory ==
Shearer is the director of Art Science Research Laboratory, a nonprofit based in SoHo, Manhattan. The organization maintains what The New York Times described as the largest private collection of historical objects and reference materials related to Marcel Duchamp available to the public. These resources supported work by Shearer and Gould concerning Duchamp’s readymades, including the view that his found objects, so-called, were optical experiments only later executed as replicas under Duchamp’s supervision.

=== Science and academic research ===
Shearer has held several research appointments, including as Technical Director and Principal Investigator for NASA’s Astrobiology Magazine, from 1999 to 2018. In 1999 she was a visiting scholar Harvard University’s Department of Psychology. “From Flatland To Fractaland: New Geometries In Relationship To Artistic And Scientific Revolutions” was one of the two keynote talks presented at Benoit Mandelbrot's festschrift in 1996. Shearer's remarks were later published in Fractal Geometry and Analysis.

== Public interest and emergency response ==
=== Cut Red Tape 4 Heroes ===
During the COVID-19 pandemic, Shearer founded Cut Red Tape 4 Heroes to distribute personal protective equipment (PPE)—including masks, gloves, sanitizing supplies, and hazmat suits—to hospital staff, firefighters, organizations serving people with special needs, and low-income communities. By May 2020, Shearer had borrowed more than $600,000 against property to fund the effort and sought additional crowdfunding. Following the pandemic Shearer's work was cited by Bradley Martin, Senior Policy Researcher at the RAND corporation, as a potential stockpiling model for future supply-chain shortages.

=== Ground Zero Frontline Response ===
In the aftermath of the September 11 attacks in 2001, Shearer and her daughter organized the distribution of supplies to personnel working at the World Trade Center site. Shearer converted ASRL’s ~3,000 sq ft residential loft and art studio, located about one mile from the World Trade Center, into a supply hub where volunteers distributed gloves, respirators, hard hats, boots, clothing, tools, and other items. Shearer told The Washington Post she borrowed about $1 million to finance the operation, later repaid with donations from foundations and individuals.

=== Housing Works ===
Shearer participated in the early development of Housing Works, an AIDS-service organization founded in 1991. She proposed using upscale thrift stores as a revenue source and, with then-husband H. Joseph Allen, contributed $100,000 in seed funding to launch the concept.

== Media ethics and reporting ==
Under ASRL’s umbrella, Shearer has overseen digital publishing with a media-ethics focus, including iMediaEthics.org (formerly StinkyJournalism.org).

Shearer won the 2012 Mirror Award for Best Single Article in the Digital Media category as publisher of IMediaEthics.org, with Malik Ayub Sumbal on the murder of Benazir Bhutto in "Mrs. Bhutto’s Murder Anniversary Part 1: Troubling Double Standard, American photojournalism’s different treatment of foreign victims."

== Work as a sculptor ==
As a sculptor, she has exhibited her work in New York City, Los Angeles and London. Her installation Woman’s Work used eight bronze sculptures of women undertaking various domestic tasks to draw attention to society's undervaluing of such activities and how such tasks were typically left to and expected of women.

In 1996, Shearer exhibited Shapes Of Nature, 10 Years Of Bronze Sculptures in The New York Botanical Garden, which experimented in the use of fractals as a new way to look at space and form. The Economist posited the differing views of fractals between scientists and artists, such as Nathaniel Friedman and Shearer. The latter was quoted as saying, "It's a new way of looking at space and form. For the artists, nothing is more fundamental.''

== Personal life ==
Shearer has two children. She was married to the biologist Stephen Jay Gould from 1995 until his death from cancer in 2002. Following Gould’s death, she had a relationship with Ronald Spadafora until his death in 2018; Spadafora led FDNY recovery efforts after 9/11, and his death from cancer was attributed to exposure at the site.

== Selected publications ==
- Shearer, Rhonda Roland (Spring 1996). "Real Or Ideal? DNA Iconography in a New Fractal Era" (PDF). Art Journal: 64–69. doi:10.1080/00043249.1996.10791742.
- Shearer, Rhonda Roland; Jay Gould, Stephen (November 5, 1999). "Of Two Minds and One Nature" (PDF). Science. 286 (5442): 1093–1094. doi:10.1126/science.286.5442.1093.
