= Ronald Spadafora =

American firefighter (1954–2018)

Ronald R. Spadafora (July 8, 1954 – June 23, 2018) was an American 39 year veteran firefighter and the Assistant fire chief of fire prevention for the FDNY, notable for his service supervising the entire safety operation during the rescue and recovery efforts at ground zero following the September 11 attacks and for his writing on firefighting, fire safety, and firefighting gear.

He was appointed to the FDNY on 2nd September, 1978. He rose through the ranks to the rank of Assistant Chief and appointed to the Chief of Fire Prevention. He died on 23rd June, 2018. (See FDNY Department Oder 61 from 2018)

== Life ==
Spadafora was born on July 8, 1954, in the Neighborhood of Ozone Park in the borough of Queens in the City of New York. He attended Bishop Loughlin Memorial High School in Brooklyn and the received a bachelor's degree in Fire Science from the John Jay College of Criminal Justice in Manhattan (later he returned to John Jay as an adjunct lecturer in fire science). He then went on to obtain a second bachelor's degree from Queens College and a master's degree from the C.W Post campus of Long Island University.

Spadafora began his career at Engine 237 in Brooklyn in 1978. He transferred to Squad 1 in 1979 and then to Ladder 105 in 1981. In 1984, he moved to Engine 219, where he was later promoted to Fire Marshal and worked at the Bureau of Fire Investigation, until he was promoted to Lieutenant in 1986. He spent three years at Battalion 33, where he was later promoted to Captain in 1989. After spending a year as a Captain in Division 15, he transferred to the Bureau of Fire Prevention in 1990. After three years, he moved to Ladder 150 in Queens, where he was promoted to Battalion Chief in 1996. After four years at Battalion 4 in lower Manhattan, he was promoted to Deputy Chief in 2000. Spadafora supervised safety efforts at ground zero for the entire rescue and recovery effort following the September 11 attacks. Later he worked on recovery efforts during the days following Hurricane Sandy. In 2002, he was promoted to Deputy Assistant Chief and was appointed to Assistant Chief for the Bureau of Fire Prevention in July 2010.

Spadafora was also a professor who taught in the emergency and disaster management program of the Metropolitan College of New York.

As a writer on firefighting and fire safety Spadafora penned over fifty articles, the great majority of which are compiled in the volume "Firefighting with FDNY Chief Ronald R. Spadafora".

Spadafora had a fifteen-year relationship with artist, scholar, and journalist Rhonda Roland Shearer which continued until his death in 2018.

== Death and legacy ==
Spadafora died on June 23, 2018, at the age of 63. According to official records, he is the 178th member of the FDNY to have died of 9/11 related illnesses.

In 2019 the city of New York named the corner of Rockaway Boulevard and 90th street in Ozone Park, Queens "Chief Ronald Spadafora Way".
