= Housing Works =

American non-profit organization

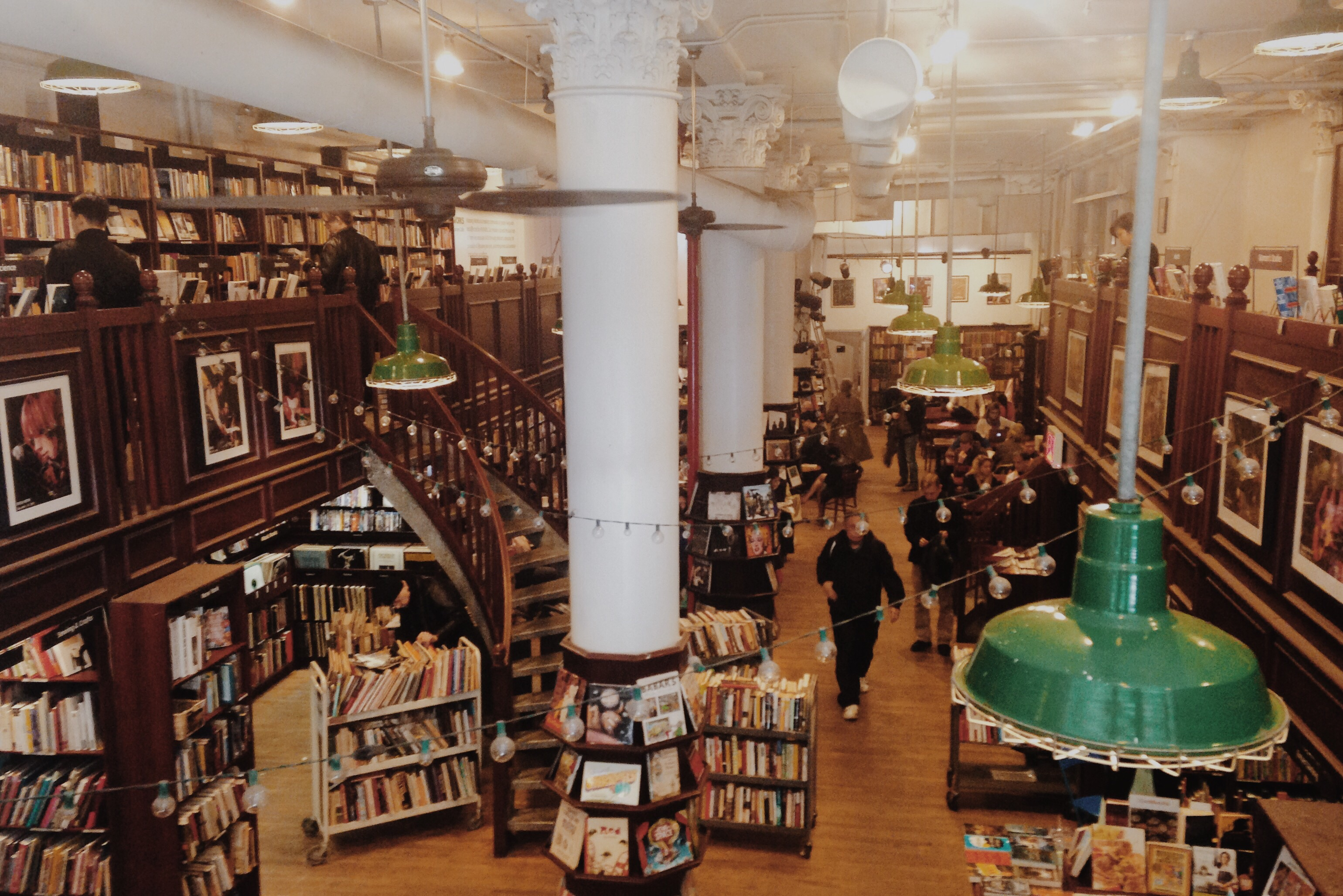
- Interior of Housing Works Cafe in April 2015
- Formation: 1990
- Founders: Keith Cylar, Charles King, Eric Sawyer and Virginia Shubert
- Type: NGO
- Purpose: End homelessness and AIDS
- Website: www.housingworks.org

Housing Works is a New York City–based non-profit fighting AIDS and homelessness. The charity is well known for its entrepreneurial businesses including a chain of thrift shops, which support efforts to end AIDS and homelessness where they are based. It is also known for its social justice activism. As of March 2017, the organization has served 30,000 clients.

In 1990, four members of the AIDS activist group ACT UP—Keith Cylar, Charles King, Eric Sawyer and Virginia Shubert—decided to dedicate themselves to serving one of New York City’s then-most neglected populations: the tens of thousands of homeless men, women, and children in the city living with HIV and AIDS. The artist Rhonda Roland Shearer, with the businessman H. Joseph Allen, contributed $100,000 in seed funding to launch the concept out of what was then Shearer's art studio. The activists called their new group Housing Works because they believed that stable housing was the key to helping HIV-positive people live healthy and fulfilling lives and to prevent the further spread of the virus.

== Operations ==
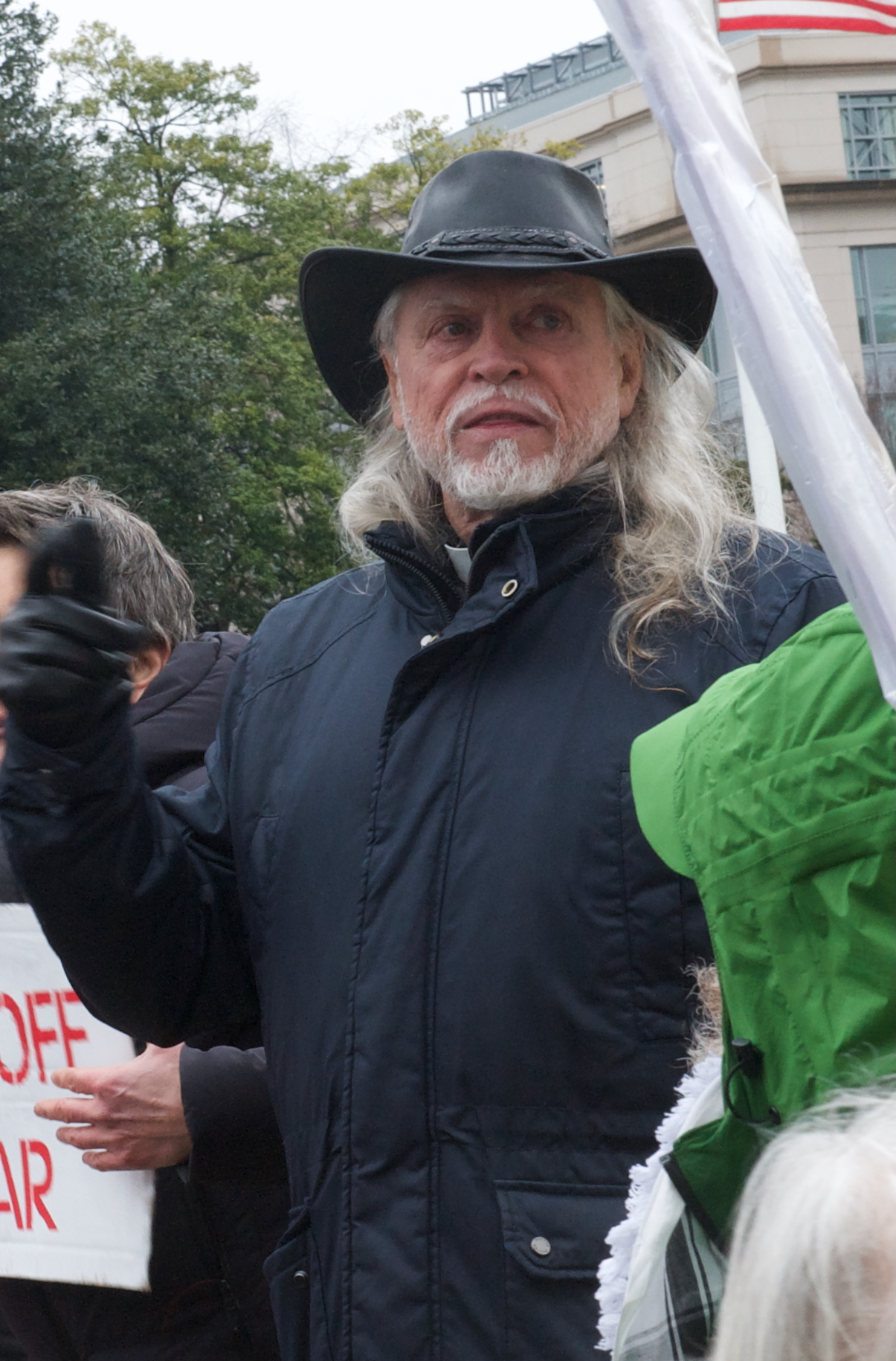
Charles King, in February 2024

The organization runs a chain of thrift shops, a bookstore café, and a dispensary as social enterprises to support their work and lower dependence on grants and donations. They also provide health care, advocacy, job training, reentry services, harm reduction services including syringe exchange services, medication for opioid use disorder, mental health counseling, adult day health care, and legal aid support. The group has satellite offices in Albany, New York, Brooklyn, New York, Haiti, Puerto Rico, and New Orleans.

=== Bookstore Cafe & bar ===
Founded in 1994 and located in Soho on Crosby Street, the bookstore cafe is a successful entrepreneurial business raising money to support the Housing Works mission. Run primarily by a team of specially-trained volunteers, the bookstore is funded entirely by donations, and resells both in the retail space and online. Free and ticketed events occur throughout the week, and the space is available for privately-rented parties, lectures, and is a popular wedding destination. Events range from story time and sing-a-long for babies, a middle-grade book group, storytelling, trivia, screenings, activist talks, comedy, music, and performance (artists include Iron and Wine, Bjork, The Black Keys, Conor Oberst, and others), and many literary events celebrating established writers and new talent. The venue hosts twice-monthly editions of The Moth StorySLAM. The Cafe and bar sells food, hot and cold drinks, and is licensed to sell alcohol. The space has been featured in numerous movies and TV episodes, most recently Law & Order SVU.

=== Thrift shops ===
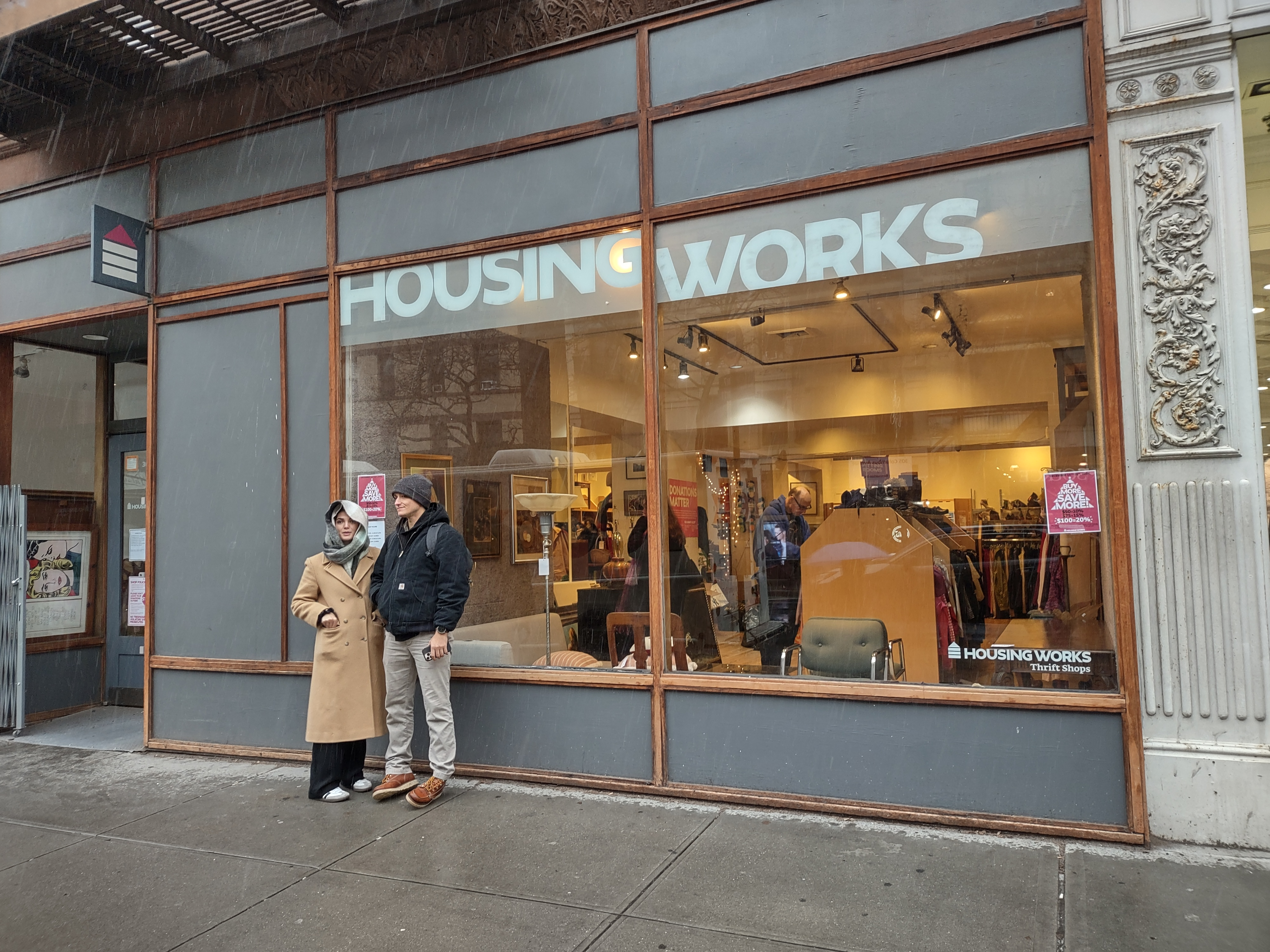
Exterior of Upper West Side shop in 2024

Housing Works is well-known to New Yorkers for its chain of upscale thrift shops. The New York Times has mentioned the shops in its neighborhood reviews. Housing Works Thrift Shop is featured in Seinfeld episode 173, "The Bookstore". George is forced to buy a book from Brentano's Bookstore because he took it in the restroom. He then tries to donate it to Housing Works Thrift Shop and claim a $200 tax write off but the clerk at the thrift shop used to work for Brentano's so she recognizes the book has been flagged that it has been in the restroom and runs him out of the store.

=== Cannabis dispensary ===
Housing Works opened New York City and New York State's first legal recreational dispensary on December 29, 2022, with the proceeds funding Housing Works' larger mission combating homelessness and AIDS. Commenters and lawmakers have questioned the propriety of a homelessness and anti-AIDS non-profit funding its activities through drug sales. Housing Works also became the first recreational dispensary in New York to offer home delivery of cannabis products.

=== Haiti earthquake relief ===
In early 2010, Housing Works became involved in providing assistance to victims of Haiti's earthquake, especially those living with HIV/AIDS, by re-building three health clinics. Housing Works CEO Charles King auctioned off his trademark pony tail, and one bidder was Evangelical preacher Rick Warren. When Housing Works relief workers were forced to "abandon eight carry on bags filled with relief supplies" due to high fees, Delta Air Lines agreed to ship the supplies for free.

=== Advocacy ===
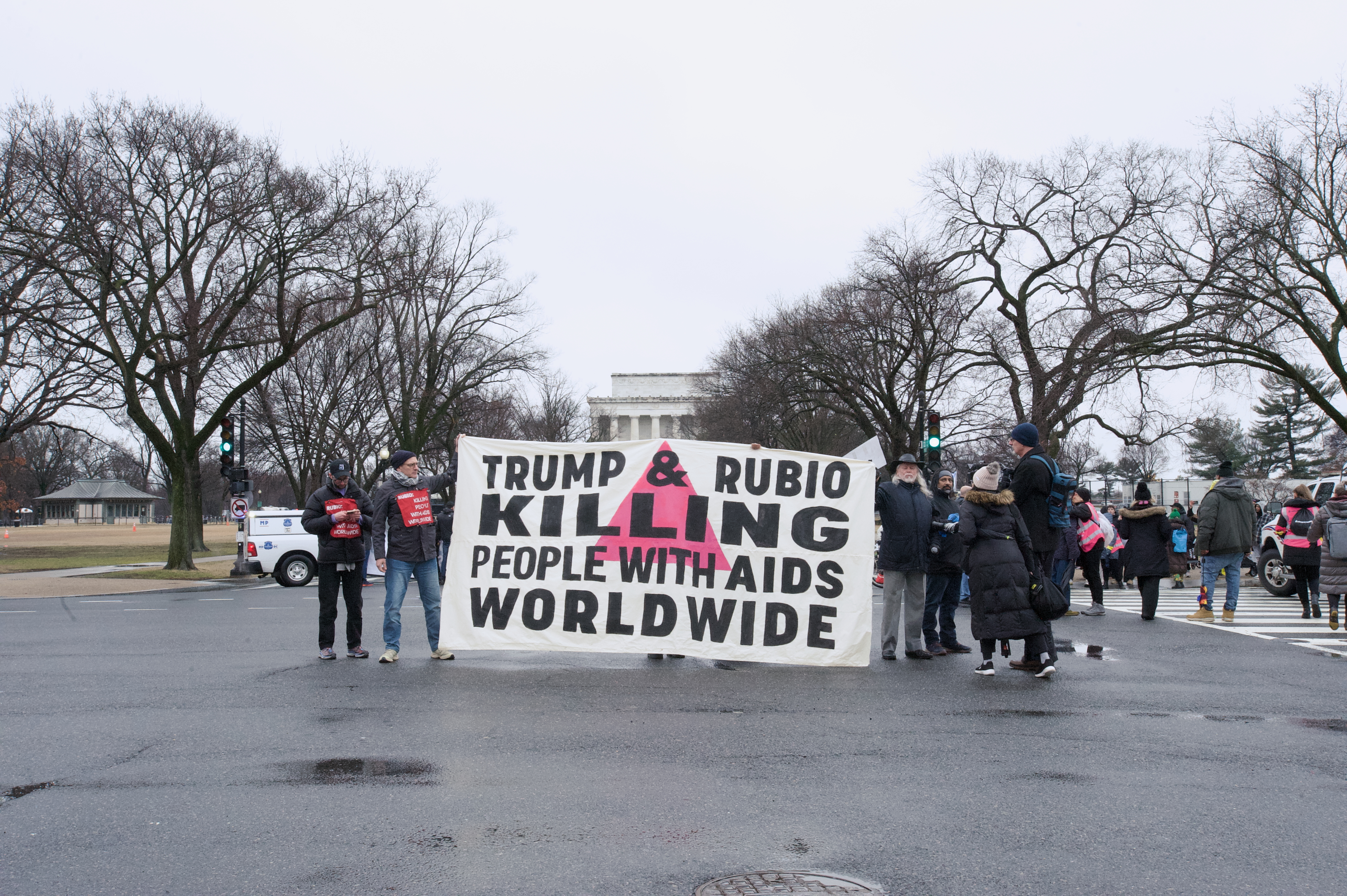
Housing Works demonstrators blocking a street in Washington, D.C., in February 2024

Housing Works is involved in advocating for health care reform and affordable housing. In 1994, Housing Works enlisted architect Alan Wanzenberg to design a 36-unit, five story residence for homeless people with AIDS or HIV.

In October 2019, Housing Works organized a mass demonstration outside of the Supreme Court in support of LGBTQ civil rights, resulting in over 100 activists being arrested.

== Controversies ==
=== Union busting ===
In late 2019 and into 2020, Housing Works leadership began engaging in what many progressive leaders and labor organizations classify as union busting after the staff began a worker-led unionization effort to address a host of issues (such as workplace safety, benefits, and a lack of a living wage for many workers while some of the organization's executives receive six-figure salaries) impacting staff and the quality of service they provide to their community. Despite their assertion that they are not anti-union, Housing Works has retained a known "union busting" firm, Seyfarth Shaw LLP, "which prides itself on keeping workplaces 'union-free,' according to its website, and has a history of cases that include working against the 1960s agricultural labor activist Cesar Chavez and defending Harvey Weinstein’s film company against a slew of sexual harassment claims."

== See also ==
- Act Up
- Rhonda Roland Shearer
- Women's Interagency HIV Study
