= Jim Wakeford =

Canadian activist

Jim Wakeford (born 1944) is a medical marijuana advocate based in Toronto, Ontario, Canada. In 1989 Wakeford was diagnosed with HIV. The medicines used to treat his illness made him nauseated and inhibited his appetite. Wakeford credits marijuana with helping treat the side effects of the medications used to keep him alive. Wakeford and his lawyer Alan Young challenged the Ontario Court's General Division for denying him, and other medical marijuana users, the right to use the drug. The Harvard paleontologist Stephen Jay Gould assisted Wakeford by testifying in the case, arguing that the illicit substance proved invaluable in treating the side effects of his cancer treatments. On September 7, 1998, Wakeford's suit against the government was dismissed. The judge ruled it was up to Parliament to overturn the law. In May 1999 the courts ruled that Wakeford could smoke and grow his own marijuana.

== See also ==
- Cannabis in Canada
