= Ontogeny and Phylogeny =

1977 book by Stephen Jay Gould

- Author: Stephen Jay Gould
- Language: English
- Subjects: Ontogeny, phylogeny
- Publisher: Belknap Press of Harvard University Press
- Publication date: 1977
- Publication place: United States
- Media type: Print
- Pages: 501
- ISBN: 0674639405
- LC Class: QH371 .G68

Ontogeny and Phylogeny is a 1977 book on evolution by Stephen Jay Gould, in which he explores the relationship between embryonic development (ontogeny) and biological evolution (phylogeny). Unlike his many popular books of essays, it was a technical book, and over the following decades it was influential in stimulating research into heterochrony (changes in the timing of embryonic development), which had been neglected since Ernst Haeckel's theory that ontogeny recapitulates phylogeny (Note: Haeckel proposed that the embryo goes through stages that resemble the adult animals from which its species had evolved.) had been largely discredited. This helped to create the field of evolutionary developmental biology.

== Context ==
Ontogeny and Phylogeny is Stephen Jay Gould's first technical book. He wrote that Ernst Mayr had suggested in passing that he write a book on development. Gould stated he "only began it as a practice run to learn the style of lengthy exposition before embarking on my magnum opus about macroevolution." This later work was published in 2002 as The Structure of Evolutionary Theory.

== Book ==
=== Publication ===
The book was published in 1977 by the Belknap Press of the Harvard University Press.

=== Summary ===
The first half of the book explores Ernst Haeckel's biogenetic law (recapitulation)—the discredited idea that embryonic developmental stages replay the evolutionary transitions of adult forms of an organism's past descendants—and how this idea influenced thinking in biology, theology, and psychology. Gould begins with the ancient Greek philosopher Anaximander, showing that the ideas formed a tradition leading to the French naturalist Charles Bonnet. Gould describes the recapitulationists in the 19th century, from the German Lorenz Oken and Johann Friedrich Meckel to the French Étienne Serres. The book examines the criticism of the theory by the Baltic German Karl Ernst von Baer and the Swiss-American Louis Agassiz, and relates 19th century phylogeny to Charles Darwin's 1859 theory of evolution, Haeckel's approach, and neo-Lamarckism. A chapter examines the pervasive influence of recapitulationism on such subjects as criminal anthropology, racism, attitudes to child development and primary schooling, and to Freudian psychoanalysis.

The second half of the book details how modern concepts such as heterochrony (changes in developmental timing) and neoteny (the retardation of developmental expression or growth rates) influence macroevolution (major evolutionary transitions). Gould examines the ecological and evolutionary significance of heterochrony, with an analysis of its effect on insect metamorphosis and neoteny in amphibians. He ends by considering theories of neoteny in human evolution, including Louis Bolk's so-called fetalization theory.

== Reception ==
=== Contemporary ===
Ernst Haeckel supposed that embryonic development recapitulated an animal's phylogeny, and introduced heterochrony as an exception for individual organs. Modern biology agrees instead with Karl Ernst von Baer's view that development itself is modified by natural selection, such as by changing the timing of different processes, to cause a branching phylogeny.

The herpetologist David B. Wake, in Paleobiology, wrote that the topic was "at once so obviously important and so intrinsically difficult" that few people would tackle it. The parallelism that Haeckel noted between ontogeny and phylogeny was, Wake observed, a strong argument for evolution, but hardly anyone dared to discuss it. He called the book very good, and predicted that it would set the stage for "endless research", but found it also in a way unsatisfying, using "undigested theory from ecology to explain what is, as yet, unexplainable. Summing up, Wake calls the book "erudite, important, provocative, and controversial", but noted that it could have been much shorter.

The embryologist Søren Løvtrup, in Systematic Zoology, noted that the book had two objectives, unexceptionably to gain practice, and "more dubious[ly]", to show that "in spite of the collapse of Haeckel's biogenetic law, the subject of parallels between ontogenesis and phylogenesis is still of importance to biology". In Løvtrup's view, this was because Haeckel's law had been refuted except where evolution had by chance happened to add to the end of development. Gould had little new to report, as people knew half a century earlier that development could be modified at other stages; the book was "a great disappointment." Haeckel could "of course be of historical interest" but Gould had chosen not to research Haeckel's influence. Work on "wrong theories" represented, Løvtrup wrote, "a terrible waste of effort and time, and block[ed] further progress."

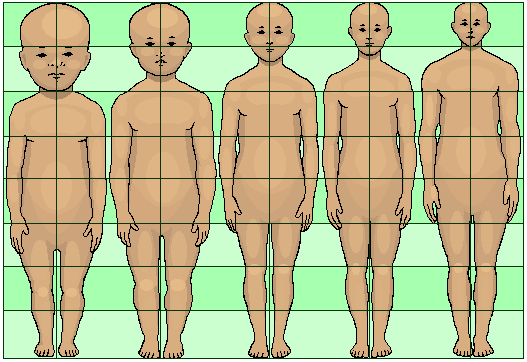
Gould's suggestion of neoteny in human development provoked a hostile response from some anthropologists.

The anthropologist C. Loring Brace, in American Anthropologist, noted that two years earlier, E. O. Wilson's Sociobiology had with "woeful ignorance" strayed into anthropology, and Wilson's "bright young colleague" Gould had now done the same thing, possibly making trouble for years to come. Gould was "a wonderful writer, literate, erudite, gracefully witty, and gifted with the ability to present difficult material in a straightforward and easily readable fashion." The bulk of the book was fine, though of no interest to anthropologists. But the tenth chapter, "Retardation and Neoteny in Human Evolution", would "mislead a great many people" who would be unable to make an informed judgement about its conclusions. Gould "turns out to be just as much of a teleologist and progressivist as the scholars of previous generations whom he appraises so effectively. He notes that we associate 'cute' features with mammals of higher intelligence, features that show 'the common traits of babyhood: relatively large eyes, short face, smooth features, bulbous cranium. The presence of this complex in advanced adult mammals argues for neoteny' (Gould p. 350)." In Brace's view, "Gould's main thesis founders between the Scylla of mosaic evolution and the Charybdis of Darwinian theory." Brace concluded that Gould had provided "nothing more useful than the vision that human form can be understood by regarding 'man' as an overgrown retarded child."

James Gorman, in The New York Times, wrote that the book was rich but not easy to read; it was primarily for biologists, with long and precise arguments in technical language; a simpler account of the same topic was to be found in Gould's essay "Ever Since Darwin". Gorman called the book scholarly, entertaining and informative, expressed "with clarity and wit".

The zoologist A. J. Cain, in Nature, called it "a superb analysis of the use of ontogenetic analogy, the controversies over ontogeny and phylogeny, and the classification of the different processes observable in comparing different ontogenies." It was a "massive book", in Cain's view excellently illustrated with often surprising examples, covering both the history and a functional interpretation of heterochrony. Cain found it refreshing to find someone who had a good word for Ernst Haeckel, and who did not "treat Charles Bonnet as a stupid monomaniac" but who brought out the relationship "between acquired characters and recapitulation in the work of the American neo-Lamarckians".

=== Retrospective ===
The book stimulated research into heterochrony, a change in the timing or rate of any process in embryonic development.

The evolutionary biologists Kenneth McNamara and Michael McKinney stated in 2005 that of all the books that Gould wrote in his career, "the one with the most impact is probably Ontogeny and Phylogeny ... to say that this work is a hallmark in this area of evolutionary theory would be an understatement. It proved to be the catalyst for much of the future work in the field, and to a large degree was the inspiration for the modern field of evolutionary developmental biology. Gould's hope was to show that the relationship between ontogeny and phylogeny is fundamental to evolution, and at its heart is a simple premise—that variations in the timing and rate of development provide the raw material upon which natural selection can operate."

M. Elizabeth Barnes, in The Embryo Project Encyclopedia, looking back at the book in 2014, writes that it became widely cited in evolutionary and developmental biology, encouraging research on acceleration and retardation of development (forms of heterochrony), and investigation of paedomorphosis in human evolution. Barnes notes that "along with other work by Gould, such as 'The Spandrels of San Marco and the Panglossian Paradigm' [the book] is often credited for influencing the rise of a biological approach called evolutionary developmental biology or evo-devo, which worked to integrate evolutionary and developmental biology."
