= The Panda's Thumb (book) =

1980 collection of nonfiction essays by Stephen Jay Gould

- Author: Stephen Jay Gould
- Language: English
- Subject: Science
- Publisher: W. W. Norton & Company
- Publication date: 1980
- Publication place: United States
- Media type: Print
- ISBN: 0-393-01380-4
- OCLC: 6331415
- Dewey Decimal: 575.01/62
- LC Class: QH361 .G66 1980
- Preceded by: Ever Since Darwin
- Followed by: Hen's Teeth and Horse's Toes

The Panda's Thumb: More Reflections in Natural History (1980) is a collection of 31 essays by the Harvard University paleontologist Stephen Jay Gould. It is the second volume culled from his 27-year monthly column "This View of Life" in Natural History magazine. Recurring themes of the essays are evolution and its teaching, science biography, probabilities and common sense.

The title essay (of 1978, originally titled "The panda's peculiar thumb") presents the paradox that poor design is a better argument for evolution than good design, as illustrated by the anatomy of the panda's "thumb"—which is not an actual thumb at all, but an extension of the radial sesamoid bone. Topics addressed in other essays include the female brain, the Piltdown Man hoax, Down syndrome, and the relationship between dinosaurs and birds.

The Panda's Thumb won the 1981 U.S. National Book Award in Science. (Note: This was the 1981 award for hardcover Science. From 1980 to 1983 in National Book Awards history there were dual hardcover and paperback awards in most categories, and multiple nonfiction subcategories. Most of the paperback award-winners were reprints, including the 1981 Science.)

== Reviews ==
- Books of the Times - by Christopher Lehmann-Haupt, The New York Times
