= Stephen Jay Gould =

American biologist and historian of science (1941–2002)

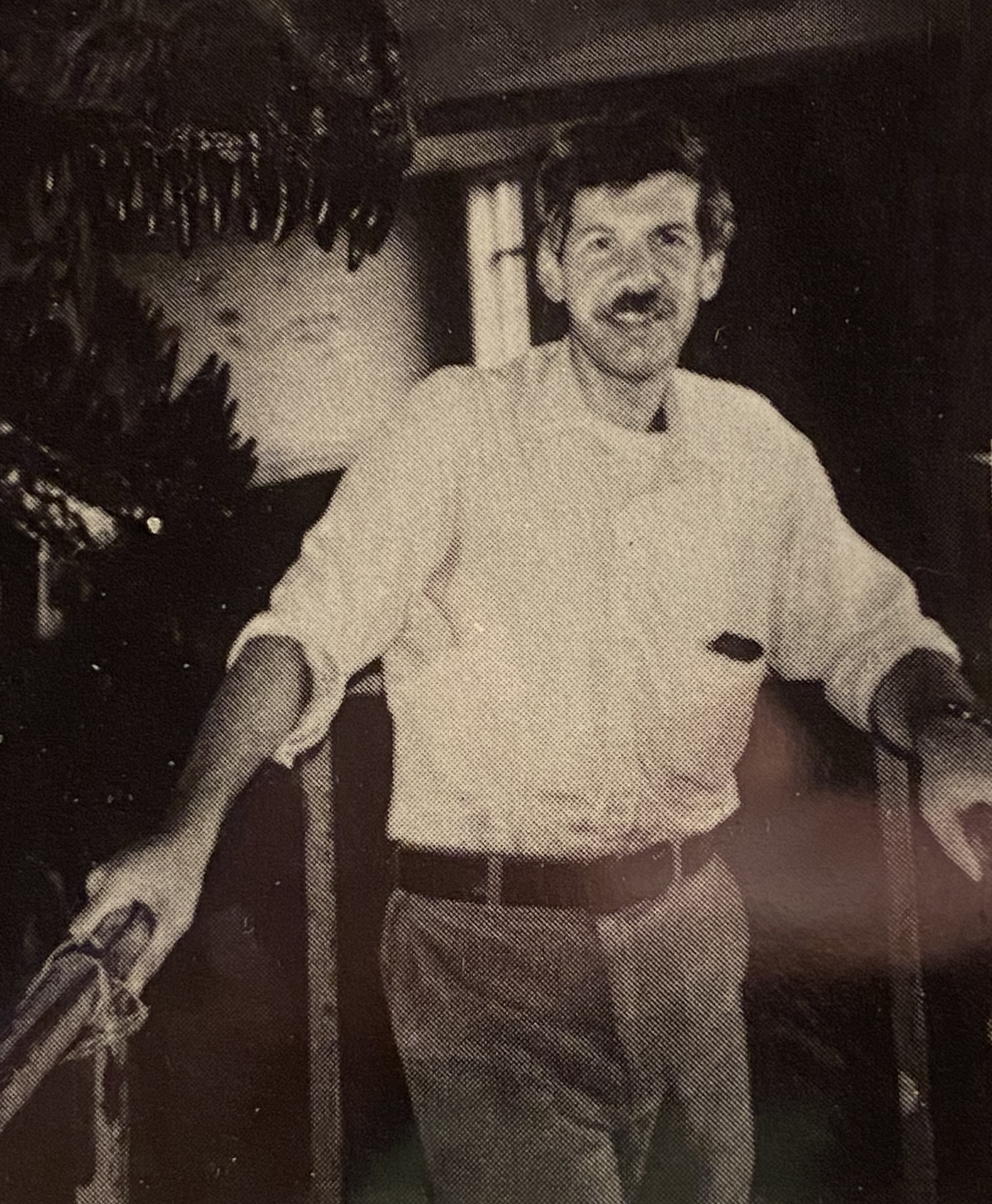
- Gould c. 1985
- Born: September 10, 1941; New York City, U.S.
- Died: May 20, 2002 (aged 60); New York City, U.S.
- Education: Antioch College (BA); University of Leeds; Columbia University (PhD)
- Known for: Punctuated equilibrium; Non-overlapping magisteria; Spandrel; Exaptation
- Spouses: Deborah Lee (m. 1965; div. 1995; 2 children); Rhonda Roland Shearer (m. 1995; 2 stepchildren)
- Awards: Linnean Society of London's Darwin–Wallace Medal (2008); Paleontological Society Medal (2002); St. Louis Literary Award (1994); Sue Tyler Friedman Medal (1989); American Academy of Achievement's Golden Plate Award (1982); Charles Schuchert Award (1975); Phi Beta Kappa Award in Science (1983, 1990); MacArthur Fellowship; National Book Award; National Book Critics Circle Award; GSA Public Service Award (1999)
- Scientific career
- Fields: Paleontology, evolutionary biology, history of science
- Workplaces: Harvard University; American Museum of Natural History; New York University
- Thesis: Pleistocene and Recent History of the Subgenus Poecilozonites (Poecilozonites) (Gastropoda: Pulmonata) in Bermuda: An Evolutionary Microcosm (1967)
- Doctoral advisors: R. L. Batten; J. Imbrie; Norman D. Newell
- Doctoral students: Daniel Fisher; Linda Ivany; Jack Sepkoski; Kurt Wise

Signature
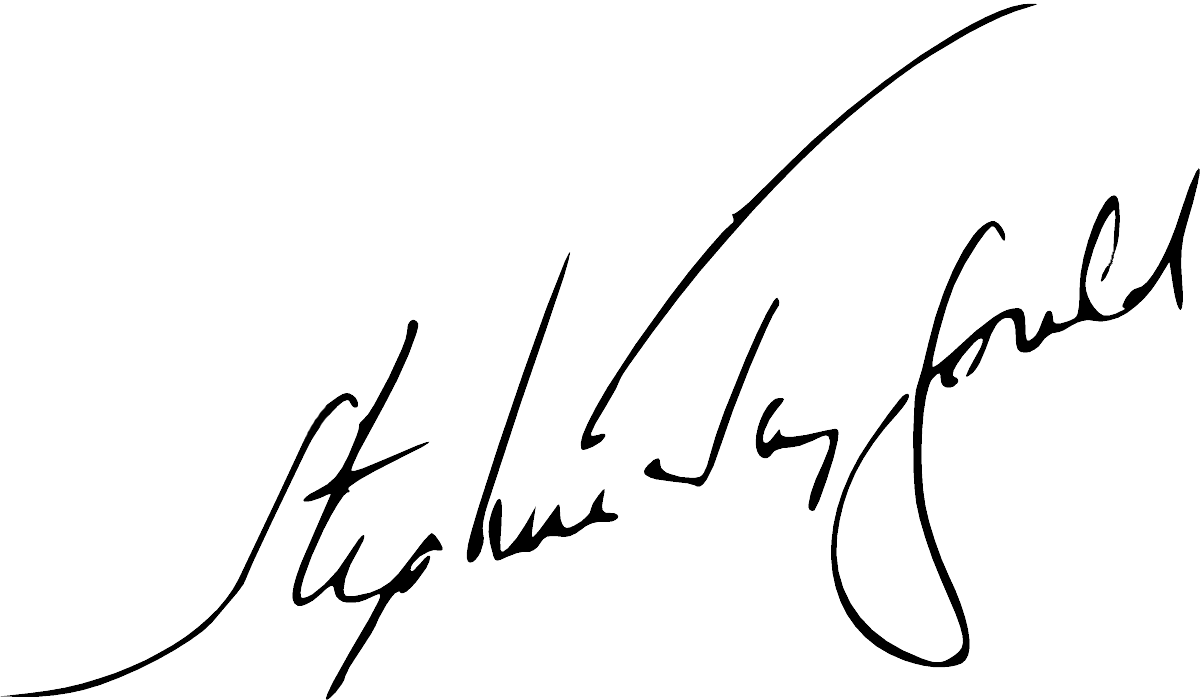

Stephen Jay Gould (/ɡuːld/ GOOLD; September 10, 1941 – May 20, 2002) was an American paleontologist, evolutionary biologist, historian of science, and one of the most widely read authors of popular science of his generation. Gould spent most of his career teaching at Harvard University and working at the American Museum of Natural History in New York. In 1996, Gould was hired as the Vincent Astor Visiting Research Professor of Biology at New York University, after which he divided his time teaching between there and Harvard.

Gould's most significant contribution to his field was the theory of punctuated equilibrium developed with Niles Eldredge in 1972. The theory proposes that most evolution is characterized by long periods of evolutionary stability, infrequently punctuated by swift periods of branching speciation. The theory was contrasted against phyletic gradualism, the popular idea that evolutionary change is marked by a pattern of smooth and continuous change in the fossil record.

Most of Gould's empirical research was based on the land snail genera Poecilozonites and Cerion. He also made important contributions to evolutionary developmental biology, receiving broad professional recognition for his book Ontogeny and Phylogeny. In evolutionary theory he opposed the overemphasis placed on natural selection, and was critical of biological determinist theories of human behavior in sociobiology and evolutionary psychology. As a public advocate for science he campaigned against creationism and proposed that science and religion should be considered two distinct fields (or "non-overlapping magisteria") whose authorities do not overlap.

Gould was known by the general public mainly for his 300 popular essays in Natural History magazine, and his numerous books written for both the specialist and non-specialist. In April 2000, the US Library of Congress named him a "Living Legend".

== Biography ==
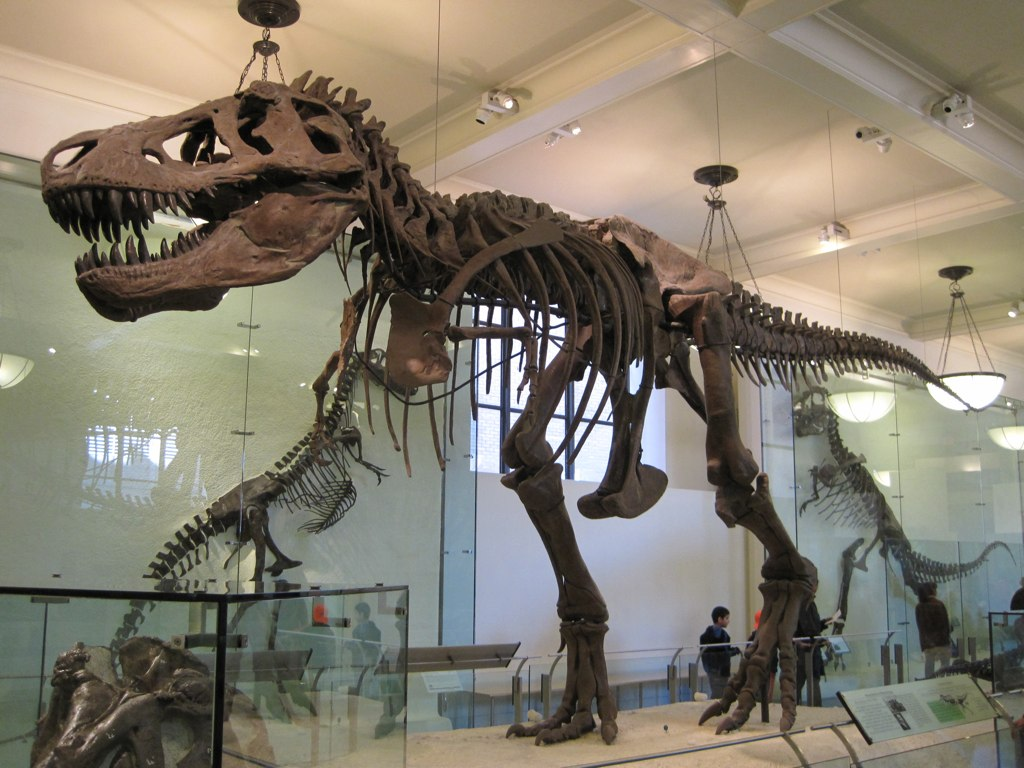
Gould's inspiration to become a paleontologist: T. rex specimen AMNH 5027, American Museum of Natural History, New York City

Stephen Jay Gould was born in Queens, New York, on September 10, 1941. His father Leonard was a court stenographer and a World War II veteran of the United States Navy. His mother Eleanor was an artist, whose parents were Jewish immigrants living and working in the city's Garment District. Gould and his younger brother Peter were raised in Bayside, a middle-class neighborhood in the northeastern section of Queens. He attended P.S. 26 elementary school and graduated from Jamaica High School.

When Gould was five years old his father took him to the Hall of Dinosaurs in the American Museum of Natural History, where he first encountered Tyrannosaurus rex. "I had no idea there were such things—I was awestruck," Gould once recalled. It was in that moment that he decided to become a paleontologist.

Raised in a secular Jewish home, Gould did not formally practice religion and preferred to be called an agnostic. When asked directly if he was an agnostic in Skeptic magazine, he responded:

If you absolutely forced me to bet on the existence of a conventional anthropomorphic deity, of course I'd bet no. But, basically, Huxley was right when he said that agnosticism is the only honorable position because we really cannot know. And that's right. I'd be real surprised if there turned out to be a conventional God.

Though he "had been brought up by a Marxist father", he stated that his father's politics were "very different" from his own. In describing his own political views, he has said they "tend to the left of center". According to Gould the most influential political books he read were C. Wright Mills's The Power Elite and the political writings of Noam Chomsky.

While attending Antioch College in Yellow Springs, Ohio, in the early 1960s, Gould was active in the civil rights movement and often campaigned for social justice. When he attended the University of Leeds as a visiting undergraduate, he organized weekly demonstrations outside a Bradford dance hall which refused to admit black people. Gould continued these demonstrations until the policy was revoked. Throughout his career and writings, he spoke out against cultural oppression in all its forms, especially what he saw as the pseudoscience used in the service of racism and sexism.

Interspersed throughout his scientific essays for Natural History, Gould frequently referred to his non-scientific interests and pastimes. As a boy he collected baseball cards and remained an avid New York Yankees fan throughout his life. As an adult he was fond of science fiction movies but often lamented their poor storytelling and presentation of science. His other interests included singing baritone in the Boston Cecilia, and he was a great aficionado of Gilbert and Sullivan operas. He collected rare antiquarian books, possessed an enthusiasm for architecture, and delighted in city walks. He often traveled to Europe and spoke French, German, Russian, and Italian. He sometimes alluded ruefully to his tendency to put on weight. His New York Times obituary refers to him as a "student of classical music and astronomy and countless other eclectia".

=== Personal life ===
Gould married artist Deborah Lee on October 3, 1965. Gould met Lee while they were students together at Antioch College. They had two sons, Jesse and Ethan, and were married for 30 years. His second marriage in 1995 was to artist and sculptor Rhonda Roland Shearer, to whom he was married until his death.

==== First bout of cancer ====
In July 1982 Gould was diagnosed with peritoneal mesothelioma, a deadly form of cancer affecting the abdominal lining (the peritoneum). This cancer is frequently found in people who have ingested or inhaled asbestos fibers, a mineral which was used in the construction of Harvard's Museum of Comparative Zoology. After a difficult two-year recovery, Gould published a column for Discover magazine in 1985 titled "The Median Isn't the Message", which discusses his reaction to reading that "mesothelioma is incurable, with a median mortality of only eight months after discovery." In his essay, he describes the actual significance behind this fact, and his relief upon recognizing that statistical averages are useful abstractions, and by themselves do not encompass "our actual world of variation, shadings, and continua".

Gould was also an advocate of medical cannabis. When undergoing his cancer treatments he smoked marijuana to help alleviate the long periods of intense and uncontrollable nausea. According to Gould, the drug had a "most important effect" on his eventual recovery. He later complained that he could not understand how "any humane person would withhold such a beneficial substance from people in such great need simply because others use it for different purposes". On August 5, 1998, Gould's testimony assisted in the successful lawsuit of HIV activist Jim Wakeford, who sued the Government of Canada for the right to cultivate, possess, and use marijuana for medical purposes.

==== Final illness and death ====
In February 2002, a three-centimeter (1.2 in) lesion was found on Gould's chest radiograph, and oncologists diagnosed him with stage IV cancer. Gould died ten weeks later on May 20, 2002, from a metastatic adenocarcinoma of the lung, an aggressive form of cancer which had already spread to his brain, liver, and spleen. This cancer was unrelated to his previous bout of abdominal cancer in 1982, though it is also associated with asbestos exposure. He died in his home "in a bed set up in the library of his SoHo loft, surrounded by his wife Rhonda, his mother Eleanor, and the many books he loved".

== Scientific career ==
Gould began his higher education at Antioch College, graduating with a double major in geology and philosophy in 1963. During this time, he also studied at the University of Leeds in the United Kingdom. After completing graduate work at Columbia University in 1967 under the guidance of Norman Newell, he was immediately hired by Harvard University, where he worked until the end of his life (1967–2002). In 1973, Harvard promoted him to professor of geology and curator of invertebrate paleontology at the institution's Museum of Comparative Zoology.

In 1982, Harvard awarded him the title of Alexander Agassiz Professor of Zoology. That same year, he received the Golden Plate Award of the American Academy of Achievement. In 1983, he was awarded a fellowship at the American Association for the Advancement of Science, where he later served as president (1999–2001). The AAAS news release cited his "numerous contributions to both scientific progress and the public understanding of science". He also served as president of the Paleontological Society (1985–1986) and of the Society for the Study of Evolution (1990–1991).

In 1989, Gould was elected into the body of the National Academy of Sciences. Through 1996–2002 Gould was Vincent Astor Visiting research professor of biology at New York University. In 2001, the American Humanist Association named him the Humanist of the Year for his lifetime of work. In 2008, he was posthumously awarded the Darwin–Wallace Medal, along with 12 other recipients. (Until 2008, this medal had been awarded every 50 years by the Linnean Society of London.)

=== Punctuated equilibrium ===
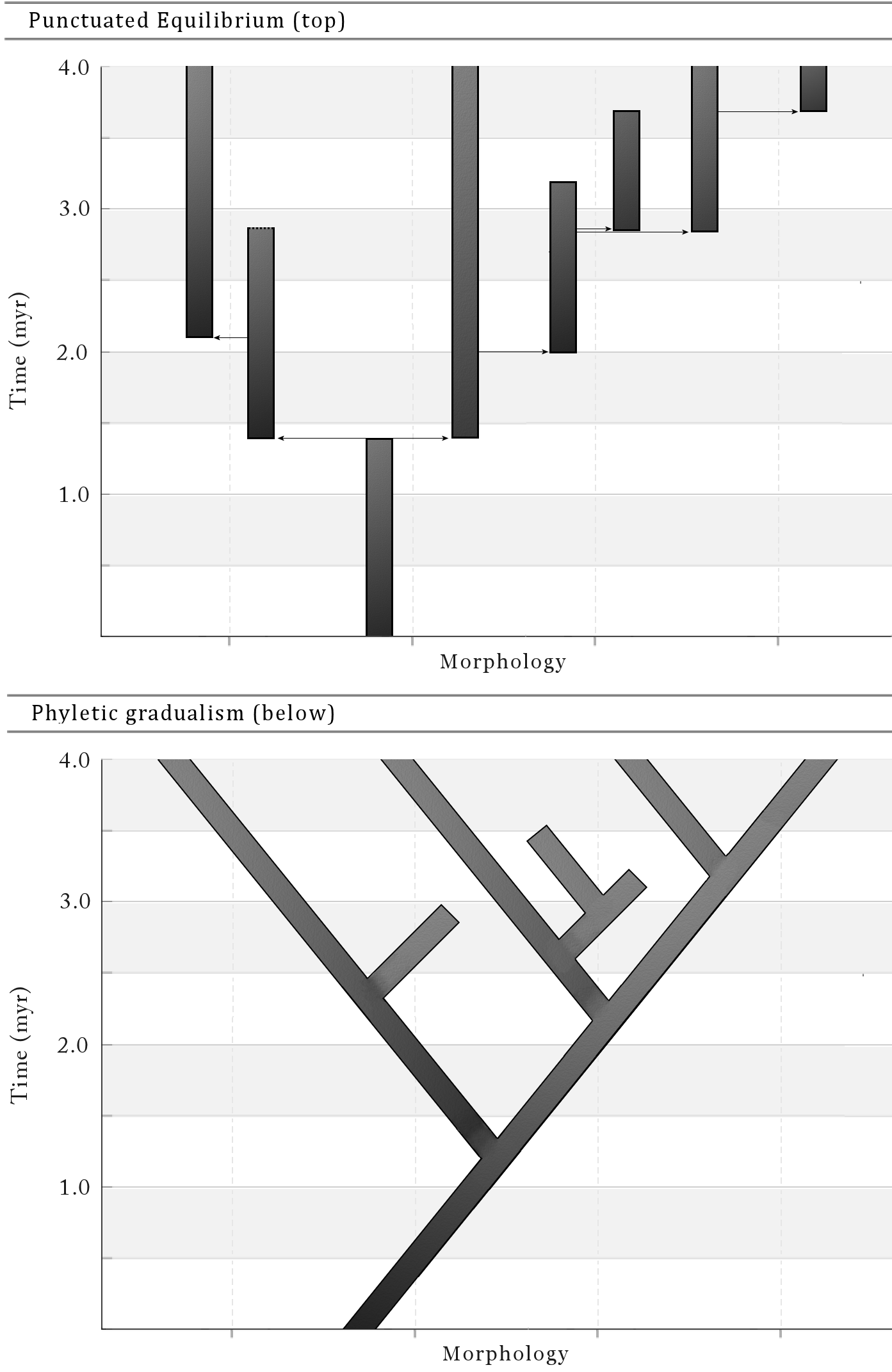
The punctuated equilibrium model (above) consists of morphological stability followed by episodic bursts of evolutionary change via rapid cladogenesis. It is contrasted (below) to phyletic gradualism, a more gradual, continuous model of evolution.

Early in his career, Gould and his colleague Niles Eldredge developed the theory of punctuated equilibrium, which describes the rate of speciation in the fossil record as occurring relatively rapidly, which then alternates to a longer period of evolutionary stability. It was Gould who coined the term "punctuated equilibria" though the theory was originally presented by Eldredge in his doctoral dissertation on Devonian trilobites and his article published the previous year on allopatric speciation.

According to Gould, punctuated equilibrium revised a key pillar "in the central logic of Darwinian theory". Some evolutionary biologists have argued that while punctuated equilibrium was "of great interest to biology generally," it merely modified neo-Darwinism in a manner that was fully compatible with what had been known before. Other biologists emphasize the theoretical novelty of punctuated equilibrium, and argued that evolutionary stasis had been "unexpected by most evolutionary biologists" and "had a major impact on paleontology and evolutionary biology".

Comparisons were made to George Gaylord Simpson's work in Tempo and Mode in Evolution (1941), in which he also illustrated relatively sudden changes along evolutionary lines. Simpson describes the paleontological record as being characterized by predominantly gradual change (which he termed horotely), although he also documented examples of slow (bradytely), and rapid (tachytely) rates of evolution. Punctuated equilibrium and phyletic gradualism are not mutually exclusive (as Simpson's work demonstrates), and examples of each have been documented in different lineages. The debate between these two models is often misunderstood by non-scientists, and according to Richard Dawkins has been oversold by the media. Some critics jokingly referred to the theory of punctuated equilibrium as "evolution by jerks", which prompted Gould to describe phyletic gradualism as "evolution by creeps".

=== Evolutionary developmental biology ===
Gould made significant contributions to evolutionary developmental biology, especially in his work Ontogeny and Phylogeny. In this book he emphasized the process of heterochrony, which encompasses two distinct processes: neoteny and terminal additions. Neoteny is the process where ontogeny is slowed down and the organism does not reach the end of its development. Terminal addition is the process by which an organism adds to its development by speeding and shortening earlier stages in the developmental process. Gould's influence in the field of evolutionary developmental biology continues to be seen today in areas such as the evolution of feathers.

=== Selectionism and sociobiology ===
Gould was a champion of biological constraints, internal limitations upon developmental pathways, as well as other non-selectionist forces in evolution. Rather than direct adaptations, he considered many higher functions of the human brain to be the unintended side consequence of natural selection. To describe such co-opted features, he coined the term exaptation with paleontologist Elisabeth Vrba. Gould believed this feature of human mentality undermines an essential premise of human sociobiology and evolutionary psychology.

==== Against Sociobiology ====
In 1975, Gould's Harvard colleague E. O. Wilson introduced his analysis of animal behavior (including human behavior) based on a sociobiological framework that suggested that many social behaviors have a strong evolutionary basis. In response, Gould, Richard Lewontin, and others from the Boston area wrote the subsequently well-referenced letter to The New York Review of Books entitled, "Against 'Sociobiology'". This open letter criticized Wilson's notion of a "deterministic view of human society and human action".

But Gould did not rule out sociobiological explanations for many aspects of animal behavior, and later wrote: "Sociobiologists have broadened their range of selective stories by invoking concepts of inclusive fitness and kin selection to solve (successfully I think) the vexatious problem of altruism—previously the greatest stumbling block to a Darwinian theory of social behavior... Here sociobiology has had and will continue to have success. And here I wish it well. For it represents an extension of basic Darwinism to a realm where it should apply."

==== Spandrels and the Panglossian paradigm ====
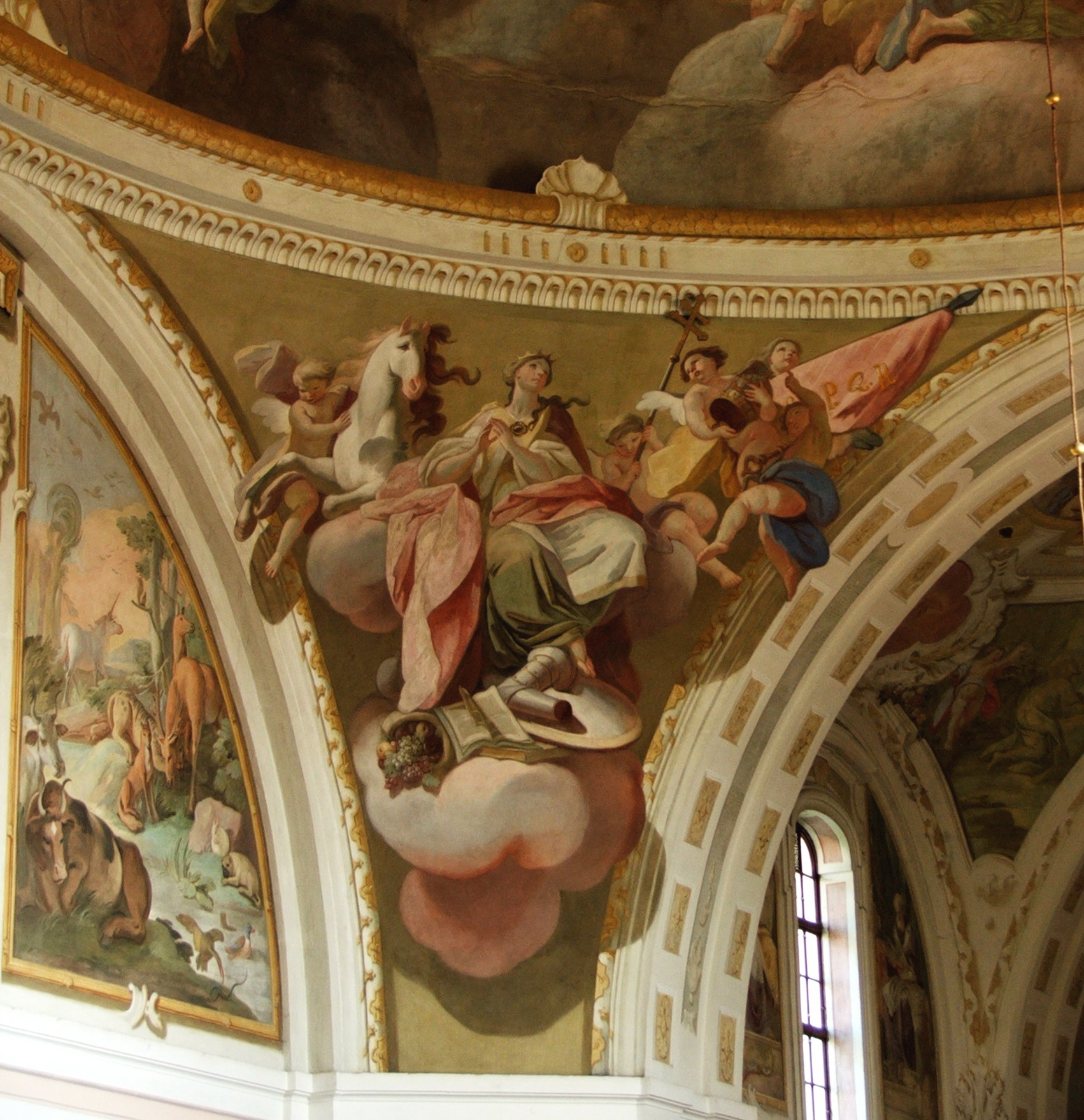
A spandrel from the Holy Trinity Church in Fulnek, Czech Republic

With Richard Lewontin, Gould wrote an influential 1979 paper entitled, "The Spandrels of San Marco and the Panglossian Paradigm", which introduced the architectural term "spandrel" into evolutionary biology. In architecture, a spandrel is a triangular space which exists over the haunches of an arch. Spandrels—more often called pendentives in this context—are found particularly in classical architecture, especially Byzantine and Renaissance churches.

When visiting Venice in 1978, Gould noted that the spandrels of the San Marco cathedral, while quite beautiful, were not spaces planned by the architect. Rather the spaces arise as "necessary architectural byproducts of mounting a dome on rounded arches." Gould and Lewontin thus defined "spandrels" in the evolutionary biology context to mean any biological feature of an organism that arises as a necessary side consequence of other features, which is not directly selected for by natural selection. Proposed examples include the "masculinized genitalia in female hyenas, exaptive use of an umbilicus as a brooding chamber by snails, the shoulder hump of the giant Irish deer, and several key features of human mentality".

In Voltaire's Candide, Dr. Pangloss is portrayed as a clueless scholar who, despite the evidence, insists that "all is for the best in this best of all possible worlds". Gould and Lewontin asserted that it is Panglossian for evolutionary biologists to view all traits as atomized things that had been naturally selected for, and criticised biologists for not granting theoretical space to other causes, such as phyletic and developmental constraints. The relative frequency of spandrels, so defined, versus adaptive features in nature, remains a controversial topic in evolutionary biology. An illustrative example of Gould's approach can be found in Elisabeth Lloyd's case study suggesting that the female orgasm is a by-product of shared developmental pathways. Gould also wrote on this topic in his essay "Male Nipples and Clitoral Ripples," prompted by Lloyd's earlier work.

Gould was criticized by philosopher Daniel Dennett for using the term spandrel instead of pendentive, a spandrel that curves across a right angle to support a dome. Robert Mark, a professor of civil engineering at Princeton, offered his expertise in the pages of American Scientist, noting that these definitions are often misunderstood in architectural theory. Mark concluded, "Gould and Lewontin's misapplication of the term spandrel for pendentive perhaps implies a wider latitude of design choice than they intended for their analogy. But Dennett's critique of the architectural basis of the analogy goes even further astray because he slights the technical rationale of the architectural elements in question."

=== Evolutionary progress ===
Gould favored the argument that evolution has no inherent drive towards long-term "progress". Uncritical commentaries often portray evolution as a ladder of progress, leading towards bigger, faster, and smarter organisms, the assumption being that evolution is somehow driving organisms to get more complex and ultimately more like humankind. Gould argued that evolution's drive was not towards complexity, but towards diversification. Because life is constrained to begin with a simple starting point (like bacteria), any diversity resulting from this start, by random walk, will have a skewed distribution and therefore be perceived to move in the direction of higher complexity. But life, Gould argued, can also easily adapt towards simplification, as is often the case with parasites.

In a review of Full House, Richard Dawkins approved of Gould's general argument, but suggested that he saw evidence of a "tendency for lineages to improve cumulatively their adaptive fit to their particular way of life, by increasing the numbers of features which combine together in adaptive complexes. ... By this definition, adaptive evolution is not just incidentally progressive, it is deeply, dyed-in-the-wool, indispensably progressive."

=== Cultural evolution ===
Gould's arguments against progress in evolutionary biology did not extend towards a notion of progress in general or notions of cultural evolution. In Full House, Gould compares two notions of progress against one another. While the first concept of progress, evolutionary progress, is argued to be invalid for a number of biological considerations, Gould permits that evolution may operate in human cultural evolution through a Lamarckian mechanism. Gould goes on to argue that the disappearance of the 0.400 batting average in baseball is paradoxically due to the inclusion of better players in the league, rather than players becoming worse over time. In his view such a process is likely reflective in a number of cultural phenomena including sports, the visual arts, and music where, unlike in biological systems, the realm of aesthetic possibilities is constrained by a "right wall" of human limits and aesthetic preferences. Gould later goes on to state that his arguments for biological evolution should not be applied to cultural change lest they be employed by, "so-called 'political correctness' as a doctrine that celebrates all indigenous practice, and therefore permits no distinctions, judgements, or analyses."

=== Cladistics ===
Gould never embraced cladistics as a method of investigating evolutionary lineages and process, possibly because he was concerned that such investigations would lead to neglect of the details in historical biology, which he considered all-important. In the early 1990s this led him into a debate with Derek Briggs, who had begun to apply quantitative cladistic techniques to the Burgess Shale fossils, about the methods to be used in interpreting these fossils. Around this time cladistics rapidly became the dominant method of classification in evolutionary biology. Inexpensive but increasingly powerful personal computers made it possible to process large quantities of data about organisms and their characteristics. Around the same time the development of effective polymerase chain reaction techniques made it possible to apply cladistic methods of analysis to biochemical and genetic features as well.

=== Technical work on land snails ===
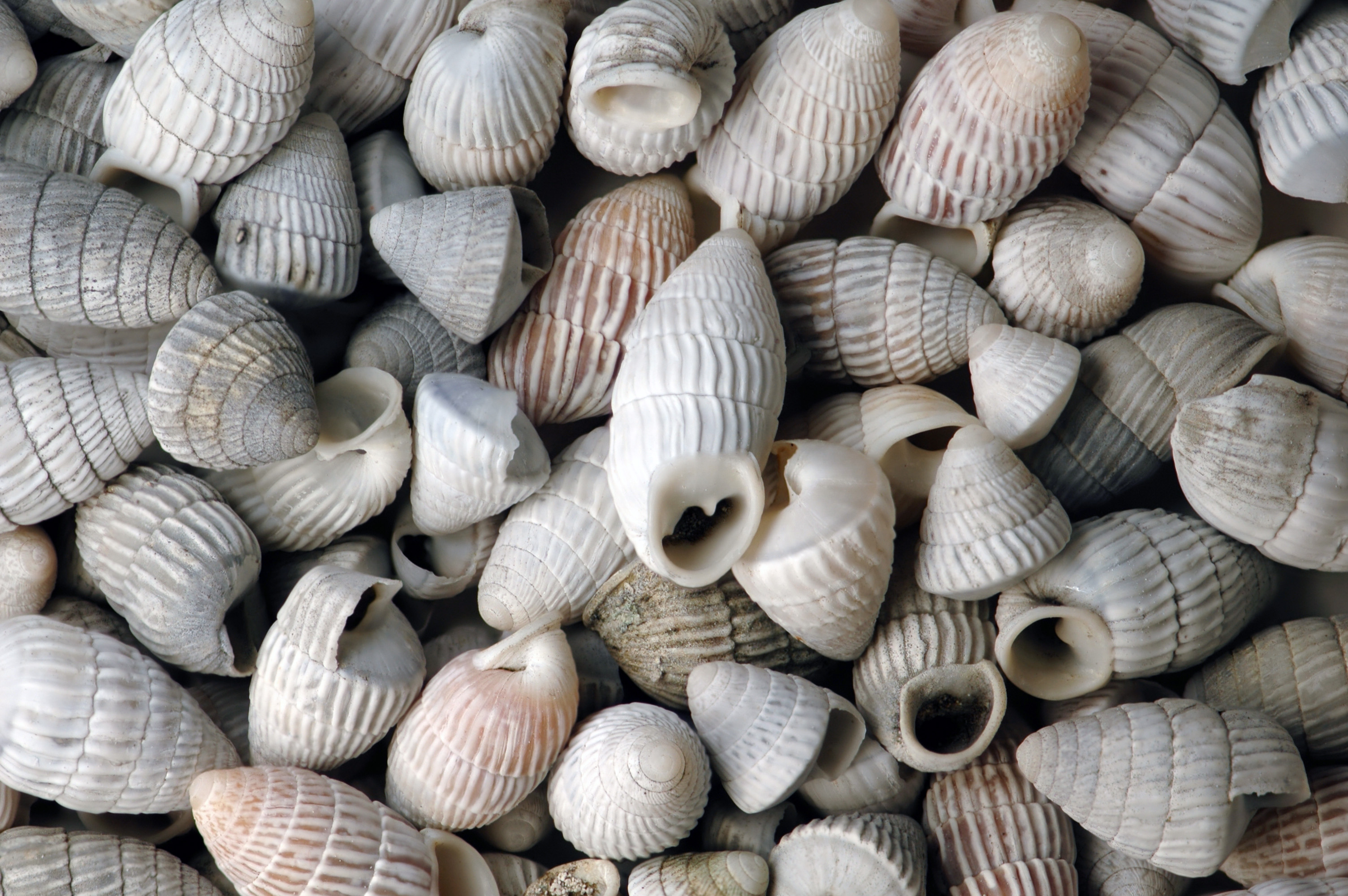
Cerion shells from San Salvador Island, the Bahamas

Most of Gould's empirical research pertained to land snails. He focused his early work on the Bermudian genus Poecilozonites, while his later work concentrated on the West Indian genus Cerion. According to Gould "Cerion is the land snail of maximal diversity in form throughout the entire world. There are 600 described species of this single genus. In fact, they're not really species, they all interbreed, but the names exist to express a real phenomenon which is this incredible morphological diversity. Some are shaped like golf balls, some are shaped like pencils. ... Now my main subject is the evolution of form, and the problem of how it is that you can get this diversity amid so little genetic difference, so far as we can tell, is a very interesting one. And if we could solve this we'd learn something general about the evolution of form."

Given Cerion's extensive geographic diversity, Gould later lamented that if Christopher Columbus had only catalogued a single Cerion it would have ended the scholarly debate about which island Columbus had first set foot on in America.

=== Influence ===
Gould is one of the most frequently cited scientists in the field of evolutionary theory. His 1979 "spandrels" paper has been cited more than 5,000 times. In Paleobiology—the flagship journal of his own speciality—only Charles Darwin and George Gaylord Simpson have been cited more often. Gould was also a considerably respected historian of science. Historian Ronald Numbers has been quoted as saying: "I can't say much about Gould's strengths as a scientist, but for a long time I've regarded him as the second most influential historian of science (next to Thomas Kuhn)." Gould's undergraduate course, Science B-16: History of the Earth and Life, was taught in a Harvard Science Center lecture hall with a 250-seat capacity. Science B-16 was so oversubscribed that an annual lottery was held to see which students would be allowed to enroll in the course. If a student was denied course enrollment three times, then their fourth entry into the lottery provided them with a guaranteed seat in the class.

=== The Structure of Evolutionary Theory ===
Shortly before his death, Gould published The Structure of Evolutionary Theory (2002), a long treatise recapitulating his version of modern evolutionary theory. In an interview for the Dutch TV series Of Beauty and Consolation Gould remarked, "In a couple of years I will be able to gather in one volume my view of how evolution works. It is to me a great consolation because it represents the putting together of a lifetime of thinking into one source. That book will never be particularly widely read. It's going to be far too long, and it's only for a few thousand professionals—very different from my popular science writings—but it is of greater consolation to me because it is a chance to put into one place a whole way of thinking about evolution that I've struggled with all my life."

=== As a public figure ===
Gould became widely known through his popular essays on evolution in the Natural History magazine. His essays were published in a series entitled This View of Life (a phrase from the concluding paragraph of Charles Darwin's Origin of Species) from January 1974 to January 2001, amounting to a continuous publication of 300 essays. Many of his essays were reprinted in collected volumes that became bestselling books such as Ever Since Darwin and The Panda's Thumb, Hen's Teeth and Horse's Toes, and The Flamingo's Smile.

A passionate advocate of evolutionary theory, Gould wrote prolifically on the subject, trying to communicate his understanding of contemporary evolutionary biology to a wide audience. A recurring theme in his writings is the history and development of pre-evolutionary and evolutionary thought. He was also an enthusiastic baseball fan and sabermetrician (analyst of baseball statistics), and made frequent reference to the sport in his essays. Many of his baseball essays were anthologized in his posthumously published book Triumph and Tragedy in Mudville (2003).

In 1997, he voiced a cartoon version of himself on the television series The Simpsons. In the episode "Lisa the Skeptic", Lisa finds a skeleton that many people believe is an apocalyptic angel. Lisa contacts Gould and asks him to test the skeleton's DNA. The fossil is discovered to be a marketing gimmick for a new mall. In the DVD commentary for the episode, Executive Producer and Showrunner Mike Scully said that the only line Gould objected to in the script was the one that introduced him as the "world's most brilliant paleontologist". In 2002, the show paid tribute to Gould after his death, dedicating the season 13 finale to his memory. Gould had died two days before the episode aired.

He devoted considerable time to fighting against creationism, creation science, and intelligent design. Most notably, Gould provided expert testimony against the equal-time creationism law in McLean v. Arkansas. Gould later developed the term "non-overlapping magisteria" (NOMA) to describe how, in his view, science and religion should not comment on each other's realm. Gould went on to develop this idea in some detail, particularly in the books Rocks of Ages (1999) and The Hedgehog, the Fox, and the Magister's Pox (2003). In a 1982 essay for Natural History Gould wrote:

Our failure to discern a universal good does not record any lack of insight or ingenuity, but merely demonstrates that nature contains no moral messages framed in human terms. Morality is a subject for philosophers, theologians, students of the humanities, indeed for all thinking people. The answers will not be read passively from nature; they do not, and cannot, arise from the data of science. The factual state of the world does not teach us how we, with our powers for good and evil, should alter or preserve it in the most ethical manner.

Gould also spoke out against creationist misuse of his work and theory, especially with respect to how his theory of punctuated equilibrium relates to the presence of transitional fossils or forms:

It is infuriating to be quoted again and again by creationists—whether through design or stupidity, I do not know—as admitting that the fossil record includes no transitional forms. Transitional forms are generally lacking at the species level but are abundant between larger groups. The evolution from reptiles to mammals . . . is well documented.

An anti-evolution petition drafted by the Discovery Institute inspired the National Center for Science Education to create a pro-evolution counterpart called "Project Steve," which is named in Gould's honor. Since 2013, Gould has been listed on the Advisory Council of the National Center for Science Education.

In 2011 the executive council of the Committee for Skeptical Inquiry (CSI) selected Gould for inclusion in CSI's "Pantheon of Skeptics" created to remember the legacy of deceased CSI fellows and their contributions to the cause of scientific skepticism.

Gould also became a noted public face of science, often appearing on television. In 1984 Gould received his own NOVA special on PBS. Other appearances included interviews on CNN's Crossfire and Talkback Live, NBC's The Today Show, and regular appearances on PBS's Charlie Rose show. Gould was also a guest in all seven episodes of the Dutch talk series A Glorious Accident, in which he appeared with his close friend Oliver Sacks. In 1999, Gould became the first recipient of the GSA Public Service Award.

Gould was featured prominently as a guest in Ken Burns's PBS documentary Baseball, as well as PBS's Evolution series. Gould was also on the Board of Advisers to the influential Children's Television Workshop television show 3-2-1 Contact, where he made frequent guest appearances.

== The "Darwin Wars" ==
Gould received many accolades for his scholarly work and popular expositions of natural history, but a number of biologists felt his public presentations were out of step with mainstream evolutionary thinking. The public debates between Gould's supporters and detractors have been so quarrelsome that they have been dubbed "The Darwin Wars" by several commentators.

A self-described Darwinist, Gould's emphasis was less gradualist and reductionist than most neo-Darwinists. He fiercely opposed many aspects of sociobiology and its intellectual descendant evolutionary psychology.

John Maynard Smith, the eminent British evolutionary biologist, was among Gould's strongest critics. Maynard Smith thought that Gould misjudged the vital role of adaptation in biology, and was critical of Gould's acceptance of species selection as a major component of biological evolution. In a review of Daniel Dennett's 1995 book Darwin's Dangerous Idea, Maynard Smith wrote that Gould "is giving non-biologists a largely false picture of the state of evolutionary theory". But Maynard Smith was not consistently negative, writing in a review of The Panda's Thumb that "Stephen Gould is the best writer of popular science now active... Often he infuriates me, but I hope he will go right on writing essays like these." Maynard Smith was also among those who welcomed Gould's reinvigoration of evolutionary paleontology.

One reason for criticism was that Gould appeared to be presenting his ideas as a revolutionary way of understanding evolution, and argued for the importance of mechanisms other than natural selection, mechanisms which he believed had been ignored by many professional evolutionists. As a result, many non-specialists sometimes inferred from his early writings that Darwinian explanations had been proven to be unscientific (which Gould never tried to imply). Along with many other researchers in the field, Gould's works were sometimes deliberately taken out of context by creationists as "proof" that scientists no longer understood how organisms evolved. Gould himself corrected some of these misinterpretations and distortions of his writings in later works.

The conflicts between Richard Dawkins and Gould were popularized by philosopher Kim Sterelny in his 2001 book Dawkins vs. Gould. Sterelny documents their disagreements over theoretical issues, including the prominence of gene selection in evolution. Dawkins argues that natural selection is best understood as competition among genes (or replicators), while Gould advocated multi-level selection, which includes selection amongst genes, nucleic acid sequences, cell lineages, organisms, demes, species, and clades.

Dawkins accused Gould of deliberately underplaying the differences between rapid gradualism and macromutation in his published accounts of punctuated equilibrium. He also devoted entire chapters to critiquing Gould's account of evolution in his books The Blind Watchmaker and Unweaving the Rainbow, as did Daniel Dennett in his 1995 book Darwin's Dangerous Idea. Other biologists contemporary to Gould went further, as in the case of Robert Trivers who classified it as "intellectual fraud".

=== Cambrian fauna ===
In his book Wonderful Life (1989), Gould famously described the Cambrian fauna of the Burgess Shale, emphasizing their bizarre anatomical designs, their sudden appearance, and the role chance played in determining which members survived. He used the Cambrian fauna as an example of the role contingency has in shaping the broader pattern of evolution.

His view of contingency was criticized by Simon Conway Morris in his 1998 book The Crucible of Creation. Conway Morris stressed members of the Cambrian fauna that resemble modern taxa. He also argued that convergent evolution has a tendency to produce "similarities of organization" and that the forms of life are restricted and channelled. In his book Life's Solution (2003), Conway Morris argued that the appearance of human-like animals is also likely. Paleontologist Richard Fortey noted that prior to the release of Wonderful Life, Conway Morris shared a similar thesis to Gould's, but after Wonderful Life Conway Morris revised his interpretation and adopted a more deterministic position on the history of life.

Paleontologists Derek Briggs and Richard Fortey have also argued that much of the Cambrian fauna may be regarded as stem groups of living taxa, though this is still a subject of intense research and debate, and the relationship of many Cambrian taxa to modern phyla has not been established in the eyes of many palaeontologists.

Richard Dawkins disagrees with the view that new phyla suddenly appeared in the Cambrian, arguing that for a new phylum "to spring into existence, what actually has to happen on the ground is that a child is born which suddenly, out of the blue, is as different from its parents as a snail is from an earthworm. No zoologist who thinks through the implications, not even the most ardent saltationist, has ever supported any such notion." In the Structure of Evolutionary Theory Gould stresses the difference between phyletic splitting and large anatomical transitions, noting that the two events may be separated by millions of years. Gould argues that no paleontologist regards the Cambrian explosion "as a genealogical event—that is as the actual time of initial splitting", but rather it "marks an anatomical transition in the overt phenotypes of bilaterian organisms".

=== Opposition to sociobiology and evolutionary psychology ===
Gould also had a long-running public feud with E. O. Wilson and other evolutionary biologists concerning the disciplines of human sociobiology and evolutionary psychology, both of which Gould and Lewontin opposed, but which Richard Dawkins, Daniel Dennett, and Steven Pinker advocated. These debates reached their climax in the 1970s, and included strong opposition from groups such as the Sociobiology Study Group and Science for the People. Pinker accuses Gould, Lewontin, and other opponents of evolutionary psychology of being "radical scientists", whose stance on human nature is influenced by politics rather than science. Gould stated that he made "no attribution of motive in Wilson's or anyone else's case" but cautioned that all human beings are influenced, especially unconsciously, by our personal expectations and biases. He wrote:

I grew up in a family with a tradition of participation in campaigns for social justice, and I was active, as a student, in the civil rights movement at a time of great excitement and success in the early 1960s. Scholars are often wary of citing such commitments. … [but] it is dangerous for a scholar even to imagine that he might attain complete neutrality, for then one stops being vigilant about personal preferences and their influences—and then one truly falls victim to the dictates of prejudice. Objectivity must be operationally defined as fair treatment of data, not absence of preference.

Gould's primary criticism held that human sociobiological explanations lacked evidential support, and argued that adaptive behaviors are frequently assumed to be genetic for no other reason than their supposed universality, or their adaptive nature. Gould emphasized that adaptive behaviors can be passed on through culture as well, and either hypothesis is equally plausible. Gould did not deny the relevance of biology to human nature, but reframed the debate as "biological potentiality vs. biological determinism". Gould stated that the human brain allows for a wide range of behaviors. Its flexibility "permits us to be aggressive or peaceful, dominant or submissive, spiteful or generous… Violence, sexism, and general nastiness are biological since they represent one subset of a possible range of behaviors. But peacefulness, equality, and kindness are just as biological—and we may see their influence increase if we can create social structures that permit them to flourish."

=== The Mismeasure of Man (1981) ===
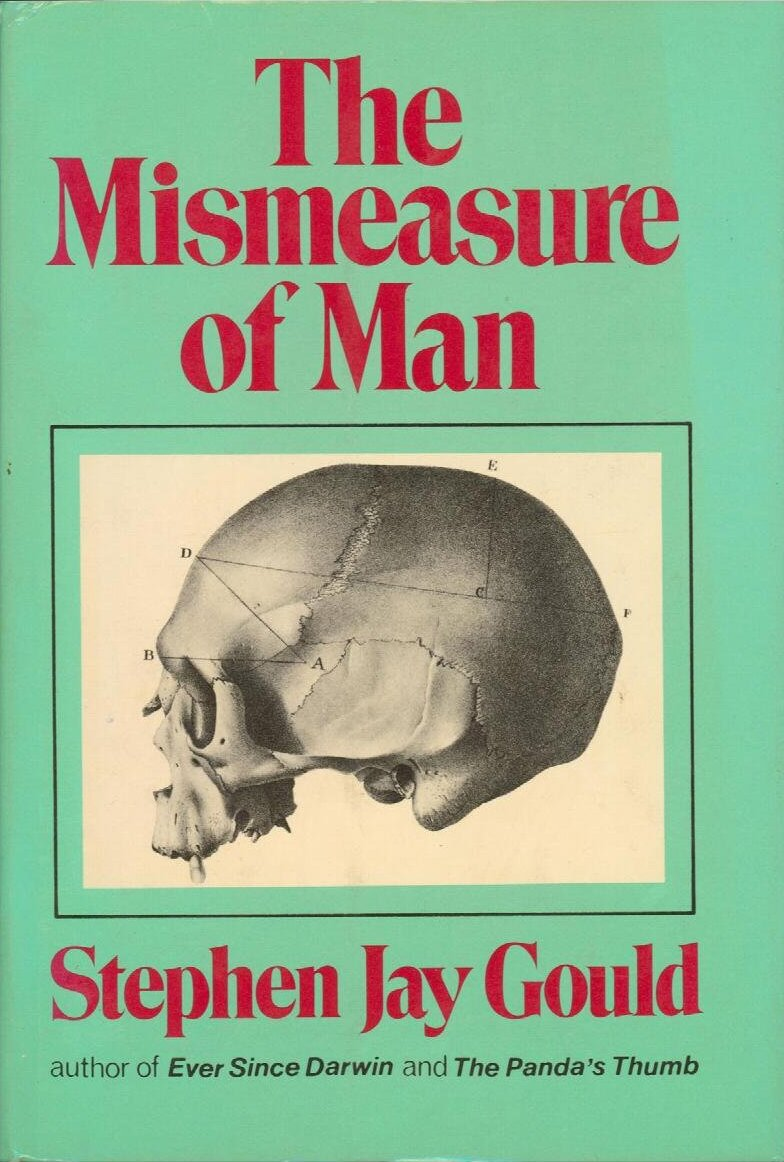
Cover of the first edition of The Mismeasure of Man

Gould was the author of The Mismeasure of Man (1981), a history and inquiry of psychometrics and intelligence testing, generating perhaps the greatest controversy of all his books and receiving both widespread praise and extensive criticism. Gould investigated the methods of nineteenth century craniometry, as well as the history of psychological testing. Gould wrote that both theories developed from an unfounded belief in biological determinism, the view that "social and economic differences between human groups—primarily races, classes, and sexes—arise from inherited, inborn distinctions and that society, in this sense, is an accurate reflection of biology." A revised edition was printed in 1996 with the addition of a new foreword and a critical review of The Bell Curve.

In 2011, a study conducted by six anthropologists criticized Gould's claim that Samuel Morton unconsciously manipulated his skull measurements, arguing that his analysis of Morton was influenced by his opposition to racism. The group's paper was reviewed in an editorial in the journal Nature, which pointed out that the paper's authors might have been influenced by their own motivations, recommending a degree of caution, stating "the critique leaves the majority of Gould's work unscathed," and noted that "because they couldn't measure all the skulls, they do not know whether the average cranial capacities that Morton reported represent his sample accurately." The journal stated that Gould's opposition to racism may have biased his interpretation of Morton's data, but also noted that "Lewis and his colleagues have their own motivations. Several in the group have an association with the University of Pennsylvania, to whom Morton donated his collection of skulls, and have an interest in seeing the valuable but understudied skull collection freed from the stigma of bias and did not accept Gould's theory "that the scientific method is inevitably tainted by bias".

In 2014, the group's paper was critically reviewed in the journal Evolution & Development by University of Pennsylvania philosopher professor Michael Weisberg, who tended to support Gould's original accusations, concluding that "there is prima facie evidence of a racial bias in Morton's measurements". Weisberg concludes that although Gould did make several errors and overstated his case in a number of places, Morton's work "remains a cautionary example of racial bias in the science of human differences". In 2015, biologists and philosophers Jonathan Kaplan, Massimo Pigliucci, and Joshua Banta published an article arguing that no meaningful conclusions could be drawn from Morton's data. They agreed with Gould, and disagreed with the 2011 study, insofar as Morton's study was seriously flawed, but they agreed with the 2011 study insofar as Gould's analysis was in many ways not better than Morton's. University of Pennsylvania anthropology doctoral student Paul Wolff Mitchell published an analysis of Morton's original, unpublished data, which neither Gould nor subsequent commentators had directly addressed. Mitchell concluded that Gould's specific argument about Morton's unconscious bias in measurement is not supported, but that it was true, as Gould had claimed, that Morton's racial biases influenced how he reported and interpreted his measurements, arguing that Morton's interpretation of his data was arbitrary and tendentious: Morton investigated averages and ignored variations in skull size so large that there was significant overlap. A contemporary of Morton, Friedrich Tiedemann, had collected almost identical skull data and drawn conclusions opposite to Morton's on the basis of this overlap, arguing strongly against any conception of a racial hierarchy.

== Non-overlapping magisteria ==
In his book Rocks of Ages (1999), Gould put forward what he described as "a blessedly simple and entirely conventional resolution to ... the supposed conflict between science and religion". He defines the term magisterium as "a domain where one form of teaching holds the appropriate tools for meaningful discourse and resolution". The non-overlapping magisteria (NOMA) principle therefore divides the magisterium of science to cover "the empirical realm: what the Universe is made of (fact) and why does it work in this way (theory). The magisterium of religion extends over questions of ultimate meaning and moral value. These two magisteria do not overlap, nor do they encompass all inquiry." He suggests that "NOMA enjoys strong and fully explicit support, even from the primary cultural stereotypes of hard-line traditionalism" and that NOMA is "a sound position of general consensus, established by long struggle among people of goodwill in both magisteria".

This view has not been without criticism. In his book The God Delusion, Richard Dawkins argues that the division between religion and science is not so simple as Gould claims, as few religions exist without claiming the existence of miracles, which "by definition violate the principles of science". Dawkins also opposes the idea that religion has anything meaningful to say about ethics and values, and therefore has no authority to claim a magisterium of its own. He goes on to say that he believes Gould is "bending over backwards to be nice to an unworthy but powerful opponent". Similarly, humanist philosopher Paul Kurtz argues that Gould was wrong to posit that science has nothing to say about questions of ethics. In fact, Kurtz claims that science is a much better method than religion for determining moral principles.

== Art and Science, Overlapping Magisteria ==
With his wife Rhonda Roland Shearer, Gould co-founded the Art Science Research Laboratory (ASRL) in 1998. Based in New York City, the non-profit organization supports interdisciplinary work in art, science, and media studies. Its stated goal is to apply critical methods across different fields, including academic research and journalism.

Gould developed an interest in Marcel Duchamp, particularly the French-American artist's use of optics and perception in his readymades. With artist and journalist Rhonda Roland Shearer, Gould examined the idea that Duchamp’s artistic experiments were relevant to scientific approaches to vision and representation. Contemporary accounts of Gould’s career described him as a scientist whose work often extended into broader cultural and intellectual domains.

== Publications ==
=== Articles ===
Gould's publications were numerous. One review of his publications between 1965 and 2000 noted 479 peer-reviewed papers, 22 books, 300 essays, and 101 "major" book reviews.

=== Books ===
The following is a list of books either written or edited by Stephen Jay Gould, including those published after his death in 2002. While some books have been republished at later dates, by multiple publishers, the list below comprises the original publisher and publishing date.

- 1977. Ontogeny and Phylogeny, Cambridge MA: Belknap Press of Harvard University Press, 1977, ISBN 978-0-674-63940-9 online preview
- 1977. Ever Since Darwin, New York: W. W. Norton, 1977, ISBN 978-0-393-06425-4
- 1980. The Panda's Thumb, New York: W. W. Norton, 1980, ISBN 978-0-393-01380-1
- 1980. Gould, Stephen Jay (December 1980). The Evolution of Gryphaea. New York: Arno Press. ISBN 978-0-405-12751-9.
- 1981. The Mismeasure of Man, New York: W. W. Norton, 1996, ISBN 978-0-393-31425-0
- 1983. Hen's Teeth and Horse's Toes, New York: W. W. Norton, 1983, ISBN 978-0-393-01716-8
- 1985. The Flamingo's Smile, New York: W. W. Norton, 1985, ISBN 978-0-393-02228-5
- 1987. Time's Arrow, Time's Cycle, Cambridge MA: Harvard Univ. Press, 1987, ISBN 978-0-674-89198-2 online preview
- 1987. An Urchin in the Storm: Essays about Books and Ideas, New York: W. W. Norton, 1987, ISBN 978-0-393-02492-0
- 1987. (with Rosamond Wolff Purcell) Illuminations: A Bestiary, New York: W. W. Norton, January 10, 1987, ISBN 978-0-393-30436-7
- 1989. Wonderful Life: The Burgess Shale and the Nature of History, New York: W. W. Norton, 1989, Bibcode:1989wlbs.book.....G, ISBN 978-0-393-02705-1. 347 pp.
- 1991. Bully for Brontosaurus, New York: W. W. Norton, 1991, ISBN 978-0-393-02961-1. 540 pp.
- 1992. (with Rosamond Wolff Purcell) Finders, Keepers: Eight Collectors, New York: W. W. Norton, 1992, ISBN 978-0-393-03054-9
- 1993. Eight Little Piggies, New York: W. W. Norton, 1993, ISBN 978-0-393-03416-5
- 1993. The Book of Life. Preface, pp. 6–21. New York: W. W. Norton (S. J. Gould general editor, 10 contributors). ISBN 0-393-05003-3 review citing original publishing date
- 1995. Dinosaur in a Haystack, New York: Harmony Books, 1995, ISBN 978-0-517-70393-9
- 1996. Full House: The Spread of Excellence From Plato to Darwin, New York: Harmony Books, 1996, Bibcode:1996fhse.book.....G, ISBN 978-0-517-70394-6
- 1997. Questioning the Millennium: A Rationalist's Guide to a Precisely Arbitrary Countdown, New York: Harmony Books, 1999, ISBN 978-0-609-60541-7
- 1998. Leonardo's Mountain of Clams and the Diet of Worms, New York: Harmony Books, 1998, ISBN 978-0-609-60141-9
- 1999. Rocks of Ages: Science and Religion in the Fullness of Life, New York: Ballantine Books, January 1, 1999, ISBN 978-0-345-43009-0
- 2000. The Lying Stones of Marrakech, New York: Harmony Books, 2000, ISBN 978-0-609-60142-6
- 2000. Crossing Over: Where Art and Science Meet, New York: Three Rivers Press, 2000, ISBN 978-0-609-80586-2
- 2002. The Structure of Evolutionary Theory, Cambridge MA: Belknap Press of Harvard University Press, March 21, 2002, ISBN 978-0-674-00613-3 online preview
- 2002. I Have Landed: The End of a Beginning in Natural History, New York: Harmony Books, 2002, ISBN 978-0-609-60143-3
- 2003. Triumph and Tragedy in Mudville: A Lifelong Passion for Baseball, New York: W. W. Norton, 2003, ISBN 978-0-393-05755-3
- 2003. The Hedgehog, the Fox, and the Magister's Pox, New York: Harmony Books, 2003, ISBN 978-0-609-60140-2
- 2006. The Richness of Life: the Essential Stephen Jay Gould, London: Jonathan Cape, 2007, ISBN 978-0-09-948867-5 This is an anthology of Gould's writings edited by Paul McGarr and Steven Rose, introduced by Steven Rose.
- 2007. Punctuated Equilibrium, Cambridge MA: Belknap Press of Harvard University Press, 2007, ISBN 978-0-674-02444-1 Book review
