= Full House: The Spread of Excellence from Plato to Darwin =

Steven Jay Gould book

- Author: Stephen Jay Gould
- Language: English
- Publisher: Harmony Books
- Publication date: 1996
- Publication place: United States
- Media type: Print, e-book
- Pages: 244 pp.
- ISBN: 978-0517703946
- OCLC: 35359843
- LC Class: QH366.2 .G6593 1996

Full House: The Spread of Excellence from Plato to Darwin is a 1996 book by evolutionary biologist Stephen Jay Gould. It was released in the United Kingdom as Life's Grandeur, with the same subtitle and with an additional eight-page introduction entitled "A Baseball Primer for British Readers".

== Summary ==
Full House aims to explain to the general reader how misconceptions about statistics can lead people to misunderstand the role variation plays in driving trends in complex systems. One misconception people often have is focusing too narrowly on averages or extreme values rather than the full spectrum of variation in the entire system (what Gould calls the "full house" of variation).

The book focuses on two main examples of this misconception: the disappearance of the 0.400 batting average in baseball, and the perceived tendency of evolution towards "progress" making organisms more complex and sophisticated.

In the first example, Gould explains that the decline of the top batting average does not imply that there has been a decline in the skill of baseball players. Quite the contrary: he shows that all that has happened is that the variance of the batting average decreased as professional baseball got better and better, while the league average remained constant as the game rules changed—together causing the extreme value of the distribution—the best batting average—to decrease as well.

In the second example, Gould points out that many people wrongly believe that the process of evolution has a preferred direction—a tendency to make organisms more complex and more sophisticated as time goes by. Those who believe in evolution's drive towards progress often demonstrate it with a series of organisms that appeared in different eons, with increasing complexity, e.g., "bacteria, fern, dinosaurs, dog, man". Gould explains how these increasingly complex organisms are just one end of the complexity distribution, and why looking only at them misses the entire picture—the "full house". He explains that by any measure, the most common organisms have always been, and still are, the bacteria. The complexity distribution is bounded at one side (a living organism cannot be much simpler than bacteria), so an unbiased random walk by evolution, sometimes going in the complexity direction and sometimes going towards simplicity (without having an intrinsic preference to either), will create a distribution with a small, but longer and longer tail at the high complexity end.

== Reviews ==
- Human Chauvinism and Evolutionary Progress - by Richard Dawkins, Reprinted in A Devil's Chaplain Boston: Houghton Mifflin, 2003 (ISBN 978-0-7538-1750-6).
- Evolution Up Against a Wall - by Michael Shermer, Los Angeles Times
- Bicycles, Baseball, Bacteria & Bach - by Michael Shermer, Los Angeles Times
- Where Have You Gone, Ted Williams? - by David Papineau, New York Times
- Gould's 'Full House' Tries To Put Humans In Their Place - by Mark Jaffe, Chicago Tribune
- Stephen Jay Gould Takes A New Swing At Explaining Evolution - by Jeremy Manier, Chicago Tribune
- Full House review - by Thomas Dietz, Contemporary Human Ecology
- Where is the Progress? - by Luis Rocha, Cybernetics and Human Knowing
- Stephen Jay Gould’s Critique of Progress - by Richard York and Brett Clark, Monthly Review
- Full House review - by John Allen Paulos, Washington Post
- Full House review: - from Publishers Weekly

== See also ==
- Evolution of complexity
