= Natural History (magazine) =

American magazine

- Categories: science magazine
- Frequency: 10 times per year
- Publisher: Howard Richman
- First issue: 1900
- Company: Natural History Magazine, Inc.
- Country: United States
- Based in: Research Triangle Park, North Carolina
- Language: English
- Website: naturalhistorymag.com
- ISSN: 0028-0712

Natural History is a natural history magazine published in the United States. The stated mission of the magazine is to promote public understanding and appreciation of nature and science.

== History ==
Founded in 1900 by the American Museum of Natural History, Natural History was first titled The American Museum Journal. In 1918, it was renamed Natural History, the name under which it is published today. In January 1960, the magazine absorbed Nature Magazine.

In 2002, the magazine was purchased from the Museum by a new company, headed at the time by Charles Harris. As of 2013 the magazine is published in North Carolina by Howard Richman. There are 10 issues published annually.

Since its founding, Natural History has chronicled the major expeditions and research findings by curators at the American Museum of Natural History and at other natural history museums and science centers. Stephen Jay Gould's column, "This View of Life", was a regular feature of the magazine from 1974 until he retired the column in 2001. Other regular columnists and contributing authors current or past include Marston Bates, Neil deGrasse Tyson, Jared Diamond, Richard Dawkins, Norman D. Newell, Roger Welsch, and Thomas Nicholson.
