= Evolution: The Triumph of an Idea =

Popular science book

- Author: Carl Zimmer
- Subject: Evolutionary biology
- Genre: Popular science
- Publisher: HarperCollins
- Publication date: 2001
- Publication place: USA
- Pages: 363
- ISBN: 0-06-019906-7
- Dewey Decimal: 576.809
- Preceded by: Parasite Rex
- Followed by: Soul Made Flesh

Evolution: The Triumph of an Idea is a popular science book by Carl Zimmer. It was written to accompany the PBS documentary series Evolution. Per BioScience, "Zimmer presents his rich and up-to-date view of evolution in four units that focus on Charles Darwin and the rise of Darwinism, the creation and extinction of species, 'evolution's dance,' and humanity's place in evolution. These units are informed by disciplines as diverse as primatology, paleontology, and genetics (from Mendel's peas to the human genome) and include fascinating stories about topics ranging from the mysteries of sex to the development of the human brain." Per The American Biology Teacher, “This work, along with the video series and other resources development, provide exceptional resources for teachers designing instructional units on evolution.”

== Contents ==
In the introduction, Stephen Jay Gould looks at evolution as fact and theory. Gould writes that “misunderstanding of the broader implications of Darwinism, in particular our misreading of his doctrine as doleful, or as subversive to our spiritual hopes and needs, rather than as ethically neutral and intellectually exhilarating, have hindered public acceptance of our best documented biological generality.”

Part One Slow Victory: Darwin and the Rise of Darwinism
1. Darwin and the Beagle gives a brief history of Darwin and his predecessors, like the geologists James Hutton and Charles Lyell. Zimmer describes Darwin’s observations on the HMS Beagle from 1831-1836. His findings on fossils in Argentina and finches in the Galápagos influenced his ideas.
2. “Like Confessing a Murder”: The Origin of Origin of Species traces the evolution of Darwin’s ideas. Darwin’s observations of selective breeding (artificial selection) led him to think that something similar happened in nature (natural selection.) A letter from Alfred Russel Wallace outlining a similar theory gave Darwin the impetus to publish his masterpiece in 1859.
3. Deep Time Discovered: Putting Dates on the History of Life is about geochronology. Were the Earth not very old, there would not have been enough time for evolution to produce the diversity we see today. In 1953, Clair Patterson used lead-uranium dating to determine the age of the Canyon Diablo meteorite, which has existed since the formation of the solar system. He arrived at an age of 4.55 billion years. Multiple independent lines of evidence point to the same age of the Earth.
4. Witnessing Change: Genes, Natural Selection and Evolution in Action recounts the history of heredity. Were it blended rather than particulate, variation would not be preserved. Unbeknownst to Darwin, an Austrian monk, Gregor Mendel, worked out the laws of heredity, and found that it was particulate. Today we call the units of inheritance genes. Genetic information is stored in DNA, which codes for RNA, which directs the construction of proteins. Ronald Fisher and Sewall Wright would unify Darwin and Mendel. Theodosius Dobzhansky, in Genetics and the Origin of Species, pioneered the modern synthesis. Ernst Mayr pioneered the biological species concept. Zimmer discusses “ring species”, geographically distributed to form a ring. Zimmer looks at examples of evolution in action, such as David Reznick’s studies of guppies and Peter and Rosemary Grant’s studies of Darwin's finches.

Part Two Creation and Destruction
5. Rooting the Tree of Life: From Life’s Dawn to the Age of Microbes looks at phylogenetic trees. Carl Woese found evidence that Archaea are distinct from Eukarya and Bacteria. Thomas R. Cech found that RNA, in addition to storing information, can catalyze chemical reactions. The RNA world hypothesis suggests that it was the primordial molecule. Mitochondria and chloroplasts have their own DNA and reproduce via binary fission. Chloroplasts are genetically similar to cyanobacteria, and mitochondria similar to Rickettsia prowazekii, suggesting that they are descended from free-living bacteria.
6. The Accidental Tool Kit: Chance and Constraints in Animal Evolution looks at how a handful of hox genes determine development in animals from fruit flies to mice to humans. Zimmer looks at transitional fossils in the evolution of tetrapods (Ichthyostega and Acanthostega) and whales (Pakicetus, Ambulocetus, Rodhocetus, Basilosaurus and Dorudon).
7. Extinction: How Life Ends and Begins Anew looks at the history of extinctions.
Part Three Evolution’s Dance
8. Coevolution Weaving the Web of Life looks at coevolution. Darwin discovered the concept through his work on flowers, which evolve to attract pollinators. The pollinators also influence the evolution of flowers. He knew of an orchid, Angraecum sesquipedale, with a 16-inch nectary and predicted that there was a moth with a proboscis long enough to pollinate it. Such a moth, Xanthopan morganii praedicta, was discovered. More sinister examples come from evolutionary arms races: a predator evolves a venom, the prey evolves an antidote, causing the predator to evolve a more potent poison, causing the prey to evolve a more effective antidote, and so on. Many insects have evolved pesticide resistance.
9. Doctor Darwin: Disease in the Age of Evolutionary Medicine looks at the evolution of antibiotic resistance. Within a human host, HIV evolves in response to the victim’s immune system.
10. Passion’s Logic: The Evolution of Sex looks at sexual selection, kin selection and the Red Queen hypothesis.
Part Four Humanity’s Place in Evolution and Evolution’s Place in Humanity
11. The Gossiping Ape: The Social Roots of Human Evolution looks at important fossils in human evolution, notably Australopithecus anamensis, Australopithecus afarensis and Homo habilis. Zimmer considers the evolution of language.
12. Modern Life, 50,000 BC: The Dawn of Us looks at genetic studies of early humans, leading to Mitochondrial Eve and Y-chromosomal Adam. He looks at the evolution of lactose tolerance in populations with domesticated cattle, and sickle cell anemia where malaria is endemic. He considers cultural evolution, including Richard Dawkins’s concept of memes.
13. What about God? looks at the controversy at the teaching of evolution, particularly in the United States. Zimmer tells of Asa Gray, an American botanist and early champion of Darwin who was a committed Christian. He considers the beliefs of biologists, from Kenneth R. Miller, who finds evolution compatible with his own Catholicism, to E. O. Wilson, who found it compatible with deism. Darwin’s own beliefs seemed to change over time, though he is buried in Westminster Abbey.

== Reception ==
A review in The American Biology Teacher writes that "What sets Zimmer's work apart from the multitude of other titles on the topic is his ability to present the history and science of evolution in while placing it firmly within a modern social context. He accomplishes this with the best of a journalistic style that is direct and clear in meaning with the eloquence of an exceptional storyteller."

Kenneth R. Miller says that "Zimmer’s book is to be recommended for the broad scope that it gives to the influence of evolutionary ideas in modern biology. It is brilliantly written and above all it is profusely illustrated – a great 'coffee table' book. It is a book you can lay on the table and let visitors leaf through and chat about, enjoying the pictures and the fine prose at the same time."

A review in BioScience calls it "an accessible and elegantly designed volume that most biologists will want to buy. Charles Darwin would have loved it."

P. D. Smith writes “From the voyage of the Beagle to the latest DNA research on Galápagos finches, Zimmer takes us on a comprehensive tour of the history and implications of evolution that is hard to fault.”

C. Brandon Ogbunu refers to it as "one of the few evolution books that could truly be taught anywhere."

== See also ==
- Sean B. Carroll, Endless Forms Most Beautiful
- Richard Dawkins, The Blind Watchmaker
- Jonathan Weiner, The Beak of the Finch
