= Evolution (TV series) =

2001 documentary series produced by PBS

Series logo

Evolution is a documentary series produced by PBS. It is accompanied by an interactive website with resources for students and teachers and Carl Zimmer's book Evolution: The Triumph of an Idea.

== Overview ==
The series spokespeople were Jane Goodall (overall spokesperson), Kenneth R. Miller and Stephen Jay Gould (science spokespeople), Eugenie C. Scott (education spokesperson), Arthur Peacocke and Arnold Thomas (religious spokespeople). It was narrated by Liam Neeson.

The first episode, "Darwin's Dangerous Idea", dramatizes the life of Charles Darwin (Chris Larkin), his brother Erasmus (Mark Tandy) and wife Emma (Jane Cunliffe). The cast includes the Captain of the HMS Beagle, Robert FitzRoy (Ian Shaw), Darwin’s mentor Charles Lyell (Roger Brierley) and champion Thomas Huxley (Andy Henderson). It introduces themes that recur throughout the series. Philosophers, scientists and everyday people discuss the impact of Darwin’s theory. The title is from the philosopher Daniel Dennett, who calls Darwin’s theory “the best idea anyone ever had.” The last episode, “What About God?”, explores conflicts between science and religion and how they may be resolved.

== Contents ==
No.	Title	Original release date
1	"Darwin's Dangerous Idea"	September 24, 2001
The tree of life, sketched in Darwin’s notebook in 1837. The episode explores evolution in the past and present. It opens in Argentina in 1833, where Darwin finds fossils of ground sloths and other extinct animals, which lead him to think that life had changed over time. John Gould tells Darwin that the finches he found in the Galápagos were separate species, which leads him to suspect that species are not immutable. Darwin proposed a mechanism of evolution: natural selection. Stephen Jay Gould explains: “The survivors will be those whose variation fortuitously adapts them better to changing local environments. And as they pass on those traits to their offspring, the population changes.” Darwin gathers evidence for years, until a letter from Alfred Russel Wallace prompts him to publish On the Origin of Species in 1859. The cumulative nonrandom selection Darwin described can produce complexity, as evidenced by the evolution of the eye. James Moore discusses Darwin's personal life, ending with his burial in Westminster Abbey. Darwin didn’t know how variations arose, or how traits were passed down. Now we do: through DNA. Comparing the DNA of different species allows us to construct phylogenetic trees. David C. Page discusses the genetic similarities between humans and chimpanzees, indicating a recent common ancestor. At Ohio State University, Sarah Boysen discusses the evolution of primate intelligence. Darwin’s influence on religion is discussed. Kenneth R. Miller, biologist and practicing Catholic, says “I find this absolutely wonderful consistency with what I understand about the universe from science and what I understand about the universe from faith.” It features examples of evolution in action, in the jungles of Ecuador and in hospitals, where HIV evolves inside a human host.

No.	Title	Original release date
2	"Great Transformations"	September 25, 2001
The modern tree of life, mapped using molecular phylogeny by David Hillis. The episode explores the history of life. It opens in Egypt’s Wādī al-Ḥītān, where Philip D. Gingerich looks for transitional fossils in the evolution of cetaceans. He discusses the discovery of Pakicetus, Ambulocetus, Rodhocetus, Basilosaurus and Dorudon. In Pennsylvania, Neil Shubin and Ted Daeschler look for fossils in the evolution of tetrapods. Jenny Clack discusses her discovery of Ichthyostega and Acanthostega. Simon Conway Morris discusses the Cambrian explosion and Charles Doolittle Walcott’s discovery of the Burgess Shale fossils, particularly Pikaia. This leads to a discussion of the evolution of animal body plans. Edward B. Lewis theorized that single genes determine the development of fruit flies, a theory confirmed by Michael Levine and William McGinnis. Walter Gehring found that a mouse gene transplanted into a fruit fly resulted in the development of a fruit fly eye. A handful of hox genes control development in all animals. Sean B. Carroll discusses his field of evolutionary developmental biology. Donald Johanson discusses the evolution of bipedalism, which Liza Shapiro studies in modern primates.

No.	Title	Original release date
3	"Extinction!"	September 25, 2001
An artist’s depiction of a meteor hitting the Earth, creating the Chicxulub crater. The episode explores extinction events. It opens in the Karoo desert, where Peter D. Ward looks for fossils from the Permian extinction. He notes that 95-99% of species that have existed over the course of Earth’s history are extinct. In the Gobi Desert, Michael J. Novacek finds a plethora of mammal skulls and explains how the K-T event led to the extinction of the dinosaurs. Alan Rabinowitz discusses evolutionary ecology in Kaeng Krachan National Park. In Kauai, David Burney discusses how invasive species brought to Hawaii decimated endemic species. Other examples include zebra mussels in US lakes, brown tree snakes in Guam and leafy spurge in North Dakota.

No.	Title	Original release date
4	"The Evolutionary Arms Race"	September 26, 2001
Darwin’s work on orchids led him to discover coevolution. He knew of an orchid, Angraecum sesquipedale, with a sixteen-inch-long nectary, and predicted the existence of a moth with a proboscis long enough to pollinate it. Such a moth, Xanthopan, was discovered. The episode explores coevolution. It opens in Oregon, where Edmund Brodie Jr. looks for the rough-skinned newt, which has evolved a potent poison. Brodie explains: “Its predator, the red-sided garter snake, has evolved an antivenom, which creates selective pressure for increasing toxicity.” This is an example of the evolutionary arms race of the title. In Russia’s Tomsk prison, tuberculosis has evolved resistance to penicillin, an example of antibiotic resistance. Overuse of antibiotics has created selective pressure for antibiotic resistance, resulting in multidrug-resistant bacteria. Other disease vectors have evolved resistance to medicine, among them malaria, pneumonia and gonorrhea. Paul W. Ewald discusses evolutionary medicine. He observes that in Peru, cholera outbreaks were more severe in communities without clean water. “If you have contaminated water, allowing transmission, we expect the cholera organism to evolve to a particularly high level of harmfulness. And that’s exactly what we see.” Stephen J. O'Brien discusses feline immunodeficiency virus and its parallels with human immunodeficiency virus. A few cats had mutations that gave them immunity, and passed on their protective genes. O’Brien discovered a mutation in humans which gives resistance to HIV. This mutation is present in 10% in European Caucasians but completely absent in African and East Asian people. It is likely a legacy of the selective pressure of the Black Plague. E. O. Wilson muses on symbiosis. An example comes from leafcutter ants, which have evolved symbiosis with fungi. Wilson: “Scientists have just began to understand how two species can interact, or three, or four… But they’re a long way from understanding how thousands or tens of thousands of species can interact. … We’re the fortunate heirs of more than three billion years of evolution that created this stupendous diversity. We need to learn a lot more about the living world, and the way that humanity itself is affecting evolution.”

No.	Title	Original release date
5	"Why Sex?"	September 26, 2001
A peacock, whose plumage evolved via sexual selection. The episode explores the evolution of sex. It opens in Texas, where Jerry Johnson and his students look for lizards that reproduce via parthenogenesis. He asks the question that gives the episode its title. In Sonora, Mexico, Robert Vrijenhoek looks at fish that reproduce asexually and finds they are more susceptible to parasites. He discusses Leigh Van Valen’s Red Queen hypothesis. Marion Petrie discusses her work on peacocks, whose plumage is an example of sexual selection, and Stephen Emlen his work on parenting in songbirds. Richard Wrangham discusses sex among chimpanzees and Amy Parish sex among bonobos. Geoffrey Miller speculates on the role of sexual selection on the evolution of the human brain.

No.	Title	Original release date
6	"The Mind's Big Bang"	September 27, 2001
Paintings in Chauvet Cave. The episode explores the evolution of human intelligence. It opens beneath the hills of France, where Randy White looks for cave art. We travel to the Great Rift Valley, where Rick Potts searches for paleolithic tools. Richard Klein discusses recent changes in the human brain that allowed for the evolution of art. Jean-Jacques Hublin discusses the differences between humans and Neanderthals. Steven Pinker discusses the evolution of language. Judy Shepard-Kegl goes to Managua, Nicaragua, where deaf children have developed their own sign language. Robin Dunbar speculates on the evolution of gossip. Richard Dawkins discusses his concept of memes, an idea taken up by Susan Blackmore.

No.	Title	Original release date
7	"What About God?"	September 27, 2001
Theodosius Dobzhansky said that “Nothing in biology makes sense except in the light of evolution”. His words are inscribed at the main hall of the Jordan Hall of Science, University of Notre Dame. The episode explores the relationship between science and religion, and the teaching of evolution in the United States. It takes us to the Black Hills of South Dakota, at the Wheaton College Science Station, where students dig for fossils, which make them consider the reality of an old Earth. At Wheaton, a Christian college, many students struggle to reconcile science and religion, with some finding them complementary and harmonious. Keith B. Miller, paleontologist and Evangelical Christian, presents the evidence for evolution, and many students find it convincing. In Lafayette, Indiana, science teachers defend Darwin’s theory. In the final edition of On the Origin of Species, Darwin wrote: “There is grandeur in this view of life, with its several powers, having been originally breathed by the Creator into a few forms or into one, from so simple a beginning endless forms most beautiful have been, and are being, evolved.”

== Reception ==
Julie Salamon writes that Evolution “is bustling with ideas. A powerful sense of drama, discovery and intellectual enthusiasm runs through this rich eight-hour series... The series covers an enormous amount of ground but doesn't leave you feeling swamped. It's also soothing, approaching its sometimes fiery subject with a comforting sense of humanism."

The last episode, "What About God?" focused on religion, and "through personal stories of students and teachers, it offers the view that they are compatible". Reverend Phina Borgeson, Faith Network Director of the National Center for Science Education, provided a Congregational Study Guide for Evolution.

Twenty years after it aired, Kenneth R. Miller wrote, "The polish and professionalism of the series were without equal, and its boldness in presenting even the most complex material in terms that were easy to understand was extraordinary. Even today, when some of its science is a bit outdated, the series stands alone in its ambitious attempt to gather so many scientific strands together under the banner of evolution. In so doing, Evolution makes it clear that evolution is truly the unifying principle of the life sciences — literally nothing in biology makes sense without it."
