= Paul Ewald =

Paul Ewald may refer to:

- Paul Peter Ewald (1888–1985), German-born American crystallographer and physicist
- Paul W. Ewald (born 1950s), American evolutionary biologist
