= Parasite Rex =

2000 book by Carl Zimmer

Parasite Rex: Inside the Bizarre World of Nature's Most Dangerous Creatures
- First edition cover
- Author: Carl Zimmer
- Genre: Non-fiction
- Publisher: Free Press
- Publication date: 2000
- Pages: 320
- ISBN: 978-0743200110

Parasite Rex: Inside the Bizarre World of Nature's Most Dangerous Creatures is a nonfiction book by Carl Zimmer that was published by Free Press in 2000. The book discusses the history of parasites on Earth and how the field and study of parasitology formed, along with a look at the most dangerous parasites ever found in nature. A special paperback edition was released in March 2011 for the tenth anniversary of the book's publishing, including a new epilogue written by Zimmer. Signed bookplates were also given to fans that sent in a photo of themselves with a copy of the special edition.

The cover of Parasite Rex includes a scanning electron microscope image of a tick as the focus, along with illustrations in the centerfold of parasites and topics discussed in the book.

== Content ==
The book begins by discussing the history of parasites in human knowledge, from the earliest writings about them in ancient cultures, up through modern times. The focus comes to rest extensively on the views and experiments conducted by scientists in the 17th, 18th, and 19th centuries, such as those done by Antonie van Leeuwenhoek, Japetus Steenstrup, Friedrich Küchenmeister, and Ray Lankester. Among them, Leeuwenhoek was the first to ever physically view cells through a microscope, Steenstrup was the first to explain and confirm the multiple stages and life cycles of parasites that are different from most other living organisms, and Küchenmeister, through his religious beliefs and his views on every creature having a place in the natural order, denied the ideas of his time and proved that all parasites are a part of active evolutionary niches and not biological dead ends by conducting morally ambiguous experiments on prisoners. Lankester is given a specific focus and repeated discussion throughout the book due to his belief that parasites are examples of degenerative evolution, especially in regards to Sacculina, and Zimmer's repeated refutation of this idea.

Several chapters are taken to discuss various types of parasites and how they infect and control their hosts, along with the biochemistry involved in their take-over or evasion of their host's immune system, eventually leading to their dispersal into their next form and life cycle. An extended time is also given on the workings of immunology and how the immune systems of living beings respond to parasite infection, along with the methods that bodily functions use to counteract and potentially kill invading microorganisms. Woven into this discussion are several specific sites that Zimmer visited during his writing of Parasite Rex and the scientists he worked with to understand different biosystems and all the parasites that live within them, including human sleeping sickness infections in Sudan from the tsetse fly, the parasites of frogs in Costa Rica, primarily showcased by filarial worms that infect humans and a variety of species, and the USDA National Parasite Collection based out of Maryland.

The final chapters focus on an overall effect parasites have had on the evolution of life and the theory that it is due to parasitic infection that sexual reproduction evolved to become dominant, in contrast to previous asexual reproduction methods, due to the increased genetic variety and thus potential parasitic resistance that this would confer. This research was showcased by W. D. Hamilton and his theories on the evolution of sex, along with the Red Queen hypothesis and the idea of an evolutionary arms race between parasites and their hosts. Zimmer then discusses a final time the wide variety of parasites that evolved to have humans as their primary hosts and our attempts through scientific advancement to eradicate them. The closing chapter considers the positive benefits of parasites and how humans have used them to improve agriculture and medical technology, but also how ill-considered usage of parasites could also destroy various habitats by having them act as invasive species. In the end, Zimmer ponders whether humanity counts as a parasite on the planet and what the effects of this relationship could be.

== Style and tone ==
In a review for Science, Albert O. Bush pointed out how Zimmer creates a writing style that is written with "clarity, conviction, and seemingly without prejudice" and that while the "purist will find the odd mistakes, oversights, and minor errors of fact", these are "insignificant" and do not remove from Parasite Rex's "overall quality or, more importantly, its focus and take-home message."

== Reception ==
The New York Times' Kevin Padian praised the book and Zimmer's writing, saying that it showcases him as "fine a science essayist as we have" and that the importance of this book rests "not only in its accessible presentation of the new science of evolutionary parasitology but in its thoughtful treatment of the global strategies and policies that scientists, health workers and governments will have to consider in order to manage parasites in the future". Publishers Weekly called the book an "exemplary work of popular science" and one of the "most fascinating works" of its kind, while also being "its most disgusting". Margaret Henderson, writing for the Library Journal, recommended the book for placement in all libraries, saying that the book "makes parasitology interesting and accessible to anyone". Writing in the Quarterly Review of Biology, May Berenbaum describes Parasite Rex as a "remarkable book" that is "unique in its focus and is extremely readable" and earns the reviewer's "respect and recommendation" for being able to discuss the life cycles of lancet flukes and the Red Queen hypothesis properly in a single book. Joe Eaton in the Whole Earth Review categorized Parasite Rex as "one of those books that change the way you see the world" due to how it shows that ecosystems are largely made up of the parasites that the individual organisms carry. A review in The American Biology Teacher by Donald A. Lawrence labeled the book as a "splendid overview of current knowledge about parasites" and praised the extensive Notes, Literature Cited, and Index sections. The newsletter editor for the American Society of Parasitologists, Scott Lyell Gardner, congratulated the book for bringing the field of parasitology into the public view, saying that how Zimmer "presents parasites in the “ugh” and “oooh” mode, in addition to trying to show how parasitologists actually ply our trade" helps to provide interest into the subject. BlueSci writer Harriet Allison summed up the book as one where Zimmer "manages to weave just enough easily understandable science into each chapter in order to create an engrossing and squirm-inducing story that will have you hooked until the end". Kirkus Reviews stated its acclaim for the "vivid detail" given to the lifestyles of parasites, calling the book an "eye-opening perspective on biology, ecology, and medicine" and "well worth reading".

== See also ==
- Microcosm: E. coli and the New Science of Life
- Veterinary parasitology
- Conservation biology of parasites
