= Marion Petrie =

British evolutionary zoologist

Marion Petrie is a British evolutionary zoologist who worked on sexual selection, especially in the peafowl, where she investigated the peahen's preferences for peacock tails. She is an emerita professor at Newcastle University.

== Life ==
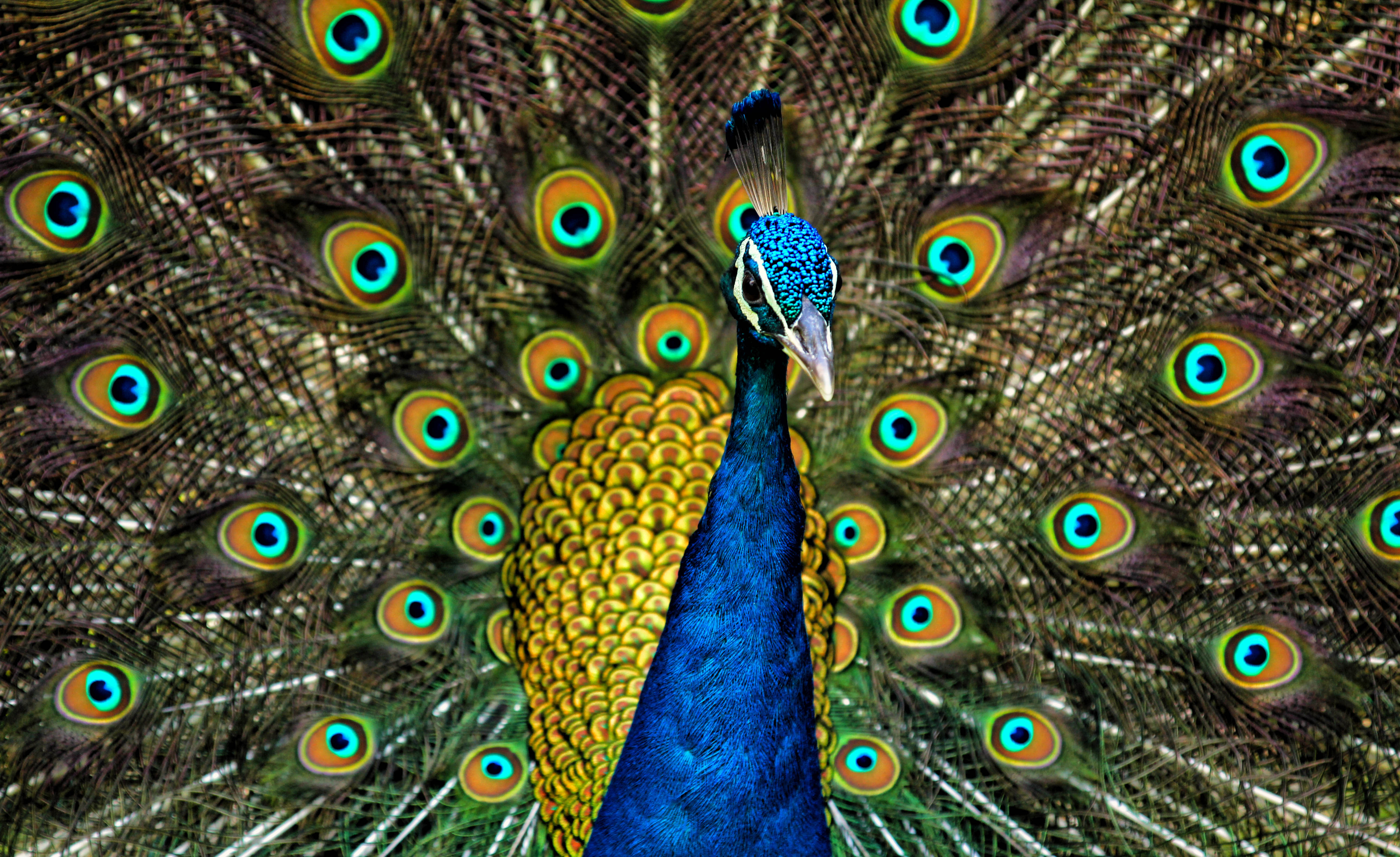
Petrie showed that a peacock's reproductive success depended on the size of its colourful train.

Marion Petrie was educated at Loughton County High School for Girls in Essex. She gained her bachelor's degree in biological sciences at the University of Sussex in 1975, and her PhD at the University of East Anglia in 1982.

She studied and wrote many papers on sexual selection, including on the peacock. Her 1997 paper "Variation in Mate Choice and Mating Preferences" has been cited over 1000 times.

She is an emerita professor at Newcastle University.

== Honours and distinctions ==
Petrie is a Corresponding Fellow of the American Ornithologists' Union.

25 years after her contribution to the 1991 Animal Behaviour paper "Peahens prefer peacocks with elaborate trains", she was interviewed about the study. A follow-up to the study was published in Nature in 1994. The American broadcaster PBS produced a "Tale of the Peacock" video guide for schoolteachers on the work. She appeared on PBS's Evolution TV series in the "Why Sex?" episode in 2001.
