= Sexual selection in fungi =

Sexual selection has been observed in fungi as a part of their reproduction, although they also often reproduce asexually. In the basidiomycetes, the sex ratio is biased towards males, implying sexual selection there. Male–male competition to fertilize occurs in fungi including yeasts. Pheromone signaling is used by female gametes and by conidia, implying male choice in these cases. Female–female competition may also occur, indicated by the much faster evolution of female-biased genes in fungi.

== Fungal sexual selection requirements ==
Most fungi can produce asexually and sexually. Currently, sexual selection has been studied to occur more predominantly in the Ascomycota and Basidiomycota phyla. Although different sexes are not present within fungi, sexual selection can act due to the presence of different sex roles as well as different mating types as most fungi are hermaphroditic. Sex roles can be distinguished in sexually producing filamentous fungi. For example, sexually producing ascomycetes can produce anisogamous gametes. The larger immobile gametes act as female gametes, while the smaller, motile gametes act as male gametes. Increased difference in the operational sex ratio (OSR) due to asymmetry between the sex roles leads to the production of more male gametes. In addition, variation within gamete quality which could affect offspring viability or fitness can also lead to differences in female/male gamete ratios.

In addition, sexual selection can occur within fungi if there is a limiting number of a certain type of gamete. The limiting gamete is typically the female gamete as they tend to be more costly to produce and invest more, energetically, in the zygote.

Most fungi have a haploid-diploid life cycle. Sexual selection is much more crucial in the diploid phase as the product of the phase immediately undergoes meiosis and can no longer be fertilized again.

== Sexual selection in mushroom fungi ==
Mushroom-forming fungi within the phylum Basidiomycota produce sexually by the reciprocal migration of nuclei and have a male-biased OSR which aids in supporting that sexual selection is present within fungi. Although there are no traditional males present, there is variation between the mating types responsible for acting as the male or female sex role. Receiving mycelia act as the female gametes while the donating nucleus acts as the male gamete. Sexual selection might occur through male–male competition or by female choice. A study demonstrated that sexual selection does occur between the donating nucleus of the heterokaryon and the receiving homokaryon through the two nuclear types within the heterkaryon. These two nuclear types are in competition with each other to fertilize the homokaryon. Female choice between the nuclear types is also possible as there is a strong bias for one of the two nuclei. However, it is more supported that competition between the donating nuclei is more responsible as it has been shown that there is a variation in the success of various nuclei independent of the receiving mycelium. Some factors that may affect the nuclei's success include faster mitotic division, increased migration, and possibly a mechanism that suppresses mitotic division in the competition.

Most basidiomycetes have two mating types, A and B, which are unlinked. However, the B locus codes for a larger amount of pheromones through subloci. Each subloci can produce many pheromones yet codes only one receptor resulting in a high redundancy of these pheromones. Although only one pheromone is necessary to fertilize, the presence of such a high amount increases the likelihood of that individual's pheromones to be received. This characteristic is hypothesized to have evolved as a result of sexual selection.

== Male–male competition in fungi ==
Competition can occur within fungi as it does in plants and animals if an inequality in the ability to access one sex role or mating type is present. This inequality could result in increased competition for access to the other mating type. Competition can also occur if there is a variation in the quality of the gametes. Within fungi, there is competition to fertilize, which can be seen as the equivalent of male–male competition in plants and animals. Sexual selection in fungi aids in explaining certain characteristics including the high redundancy of pheromones in the B mating-type locus as well as strong pheromone signaling in yeasts.

Male gametes have the ability to reproduce asexually as asexual spores if they fail to reproduce sexually. Some fungal species are capable of producing male gametes of two different sizes. Throughout evolution, the smaller gametes have lost the ability to produce asexually in order to increase the likelihood of fertilizing a female gamete by decreasing size and increasing both the amount and motility of the male gamete. This is most likely a result of direct competition as a trade-off was made in order to increase the likelihood of fertilization.

== Pheromone signaling and the presence of male choice ==
Pheromone signaling is used within fungi to either attract a mate or to assess the quality of that gamete; and tends to be more effective when occurring over small distances. Female gametes are typically the ones responsibly for producing pheromones in order to attract a mate. However, pheromones can also be released by conidia. Male choice can occur in populations where there is a low concentration of male gametes, allowing them to be selective in which female to fertilize. The female with the highest concentration of pheromone is usually chosen. In situations where fertilization may have to occur over long distances, water-soluble pheromones may be secreted as seen in the female gametes of an aquatic Chytridiomycetes. The same similarly occurs within an aquatic oomycete algae species; also, a variation in the pheromone production related to the male reaction has been observed. Variations within the pheromone production as well as the response have been studied and found be affected by environmental conditions as well as developmental differences between the fungi. Although not proven, the production of pheromones may lead to Fisherian runaway selection in which the production of pheromone increases due to the increase in its preference throughout generations.

In addition to pheromone signaling being used as a method in finding a mate, it also appears to be utilized as a method to assess mate quality. Pheromones are costly to produce due to post-translational modification and therefore may be subject to the handicap principle in which an organism cannot fake its fitness by producing pheromones. In the isogamous budding yeast, Saccharomyces cerevisiae, pheromones are used to distinguish between different mating types and show a preference for higher concentrations of pheromones along with a rejection of lower concentrations. However, all of the pheromone studies within fungi have been performed in a laboratory. More research is necessary on the effects of natural gamete density, motility, and pheromone production in nature.

== Possible polyandry and female choice ==
Post-copulatory mechanisms may also be present within fungi through polyandry in which zygote-level sexual selection might occur. Within multicellular ascomycete fungi, a haploid mycelium produces a fruiting body which in turn produces many offspring that are also haploid. Each fruiting body has the potential to be fertilized by more than one male gamete. Laboratory experiments have shown that multiple matings are possible and the female has the ability to selectively abort fruiting bodies that have been inappropriately fertilized by a closely related yet incompatible species.

== Possible female–female competition in fungi ==
A study has shown that female-biased genes evolve much faster than male-biased genes demonstrated by a rapid protein-level evolution. In most other eukaryotes, male-biased genes demonstrate a faster evolution. This may be due to specific reproductive traits within fungi, possibly allowing female–female competition to occur rather than male–male competition. This is also supported the passive nature of conidia during mating. Due to the presence of pheromones as well as the dispersal of male gametes, two or more female gametes may be attracted to one conidium, or male gamete. The presence of karyogamy further supports the possibility of female–female competition. Within N. crassa, the haploid mycelium undergoes growth as vegetative tissue prior to entering the mating cycle. This vegetative tissue can be used as a source of fertilization and can fuse with the trichogyne. This causes the female gamete to no longer be subject to male–male competition and further fertilization by a conidium. The female-biased genes that were studied and seen to evolve more rapidly than male-biased genes did so regardless of the mechanism of fertilization. Fertilization occurring by the fusion of a female nucleus and male conidium nucleus or between a female nucleus or nucleus from vegetative tissue did not alter this rate of evolution.
