= Carl Zimmer =

American science writer and blogger (born 1966)

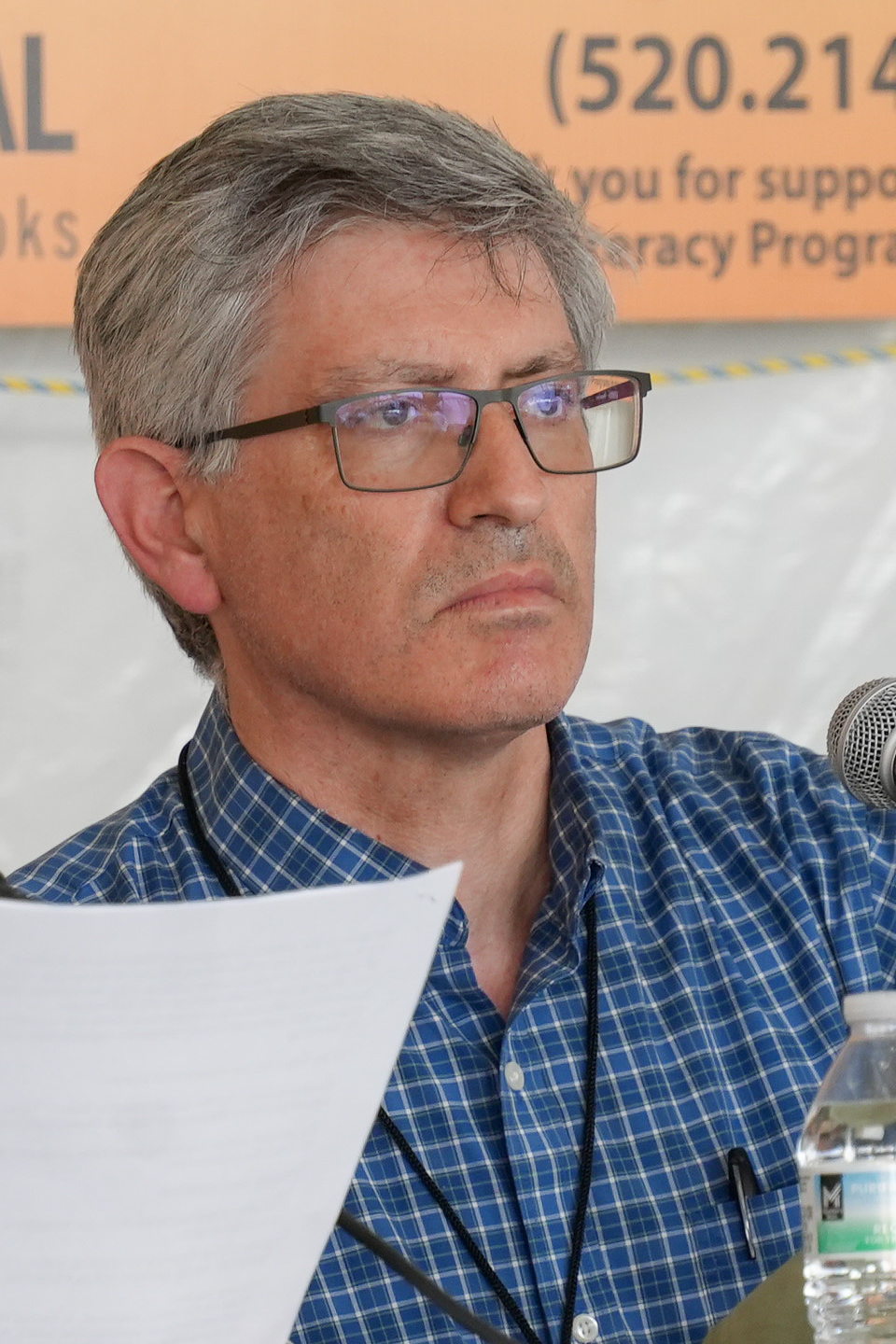
- Zimmer at 2026 Tucson Festival of Books
- Born: July 13, 1966 (age 60); New Haven, Connecticut, U.S.
- Education: Yale University (BA)
- Occupations: Popular science writer; blogger
- Children: 2
- Writing career
- Language: English
- Subjects: Evolution; parasites
- Website: carlzimmer.com

Carl Zimmer (born 1966) is an American popular science writer, blogger, columnist, and journalist who specializes in the topics of evolution, parasites, and heredity. The author of many books, he contributes science essays to publications such as The New York Times, Discover, and National Geographic. He is a fellow at Yale University's Morse College and adjunct professor of molecular biophysics and biochemistry at Yale University. Zimmer also gives frequent lectures and has appeared on many radio shows, including National Public Radio's Radiolab, Fresh Air, and This American Life. He authored Evolution: The Triumph of an Idea, a companion piece to the PBS series Evolution.

Zimmer describes his journalistic beat as "life" or "what it means to be alive". He is the only science writer to have a species of tapeworm named after him (Acanthobothrium zimmeri). Zimmer's father is Dick Zimmer, a Republican politician from New Jersey, who was a member of U.S. House of Representatives from 1991 to 1997.

== Early life and education ==
Zimmer is the older of two boys born in New Haven, Connecticut to an Ashkenazi Jewish father and a mother of Irish and German descent. His brother, linguist Ben Zimmer, is also a science communicator.

Zimmer earned a B.A. in English from Yale University in 1987.

== Career ==
In 1989, Zimmer began his career at Discover magazine, first as a copy editor and fact checker, eventually serving as a senior editor from 1994 to 1998. Zimmer left Discover after ten years to focus on books and other projects. In 2004, he started a blog called "The Loom", in which he wrote about topics related to his books, but later expanded it into what he terms "a place where I could write about things I might not be turning into an article for a magazine, but were really interesting'. The Loom has been hosted by Discover and National Geographic for many years, and has been invited to be part of Scienceblogs. It was transferred to Zimmer's personal website in 2018. Zimmer writes a weekly column called "Matter" in The New York Times. Zimmer and the STAT team have put out "Game of Genomes", a 13-part series that enlisted two dozen scientists, with the goal of exploring Zimmer's own genome.

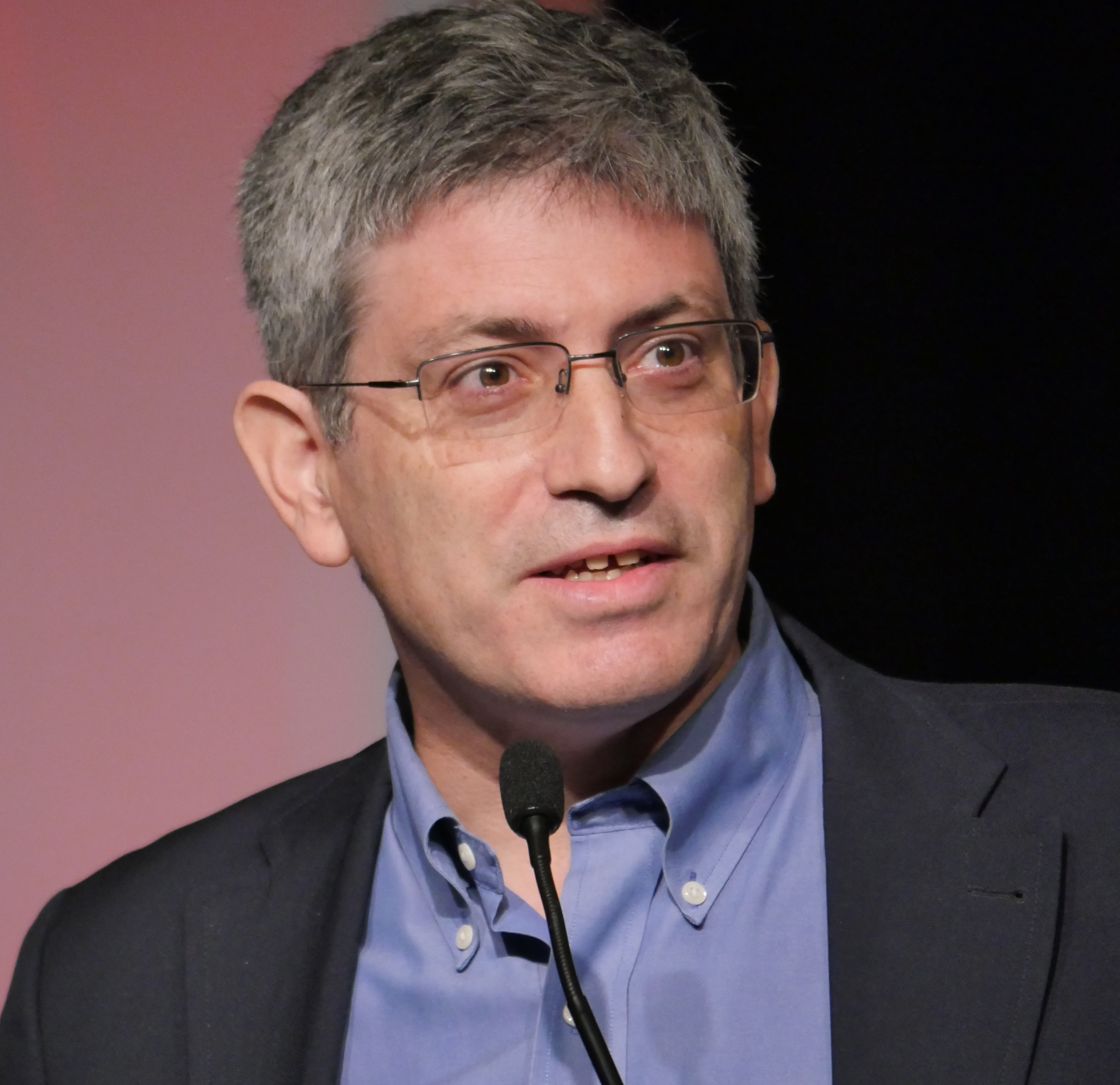
Zimmer in 2018

He has given lectures at universities, medical schools, and museums. In 2009, Zimmer was the keynote speaker at Northeast Conference on Science and Skepticism (NECSS). He also presented at NECSS 2011 and CSICon 2018. Zimmer has twice been a spotlight speaker at the Aspen Ideas Festival, in 2017 and 2018. In 2009 and 2010 he was host of the periodic audio podcast "Meet the Scientist" of the American Society for Microbiology. Zimmer's 2004 article "Whose Life Would You Save?" was included in the 2005 The Best American Science and Nature Writing series.

Zimmer has received a number of awards, including the 2007 National Academies Communication Award, a prize for science communication from the United States National Academy of Sciences, for his wide-ranging coverage of biology and evolution in newspapers, magazines, and his blog. In 2016 Yale University appointed Zimmer Adjunct Professor of Molecular Biophysics and Biochemistry, stating that he is "a world-renowned science journalist and teacher, and his ability to make science, particularly biology, accessible to the general public is without peer". Zimmer has taught a science communication course at Yale since 2017 and participates in other molecular biophysics and biochemistry courses.

== Fellowships ==
- 2002: John Simon Guggenheim Memorial Foundation Fellowship.
- 2005: Poynter Fellowship, Yale University. Invited speaker, Psychology.
- 2006: Alfred P. Sloan Foundation Grant for Public Understanding of Science and Technology
- 2010: Poynter Fellowship, Yale. Invited speaker, Molecular Biophysics and Biochemistry
- 2015: Osher Fellowship, California Academy of Sciences
- 2017: Alfred P. Sloan Foundation Grant for Public Understanding of Science and Technology

== Honors ==
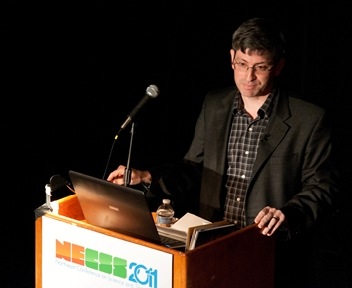
Zimmer speaking at the 2011 NECSS conference

- 1994: Everett Clark/Seth Payne Award for Young Science Journalists, awarded "to encourage young science writers by recognizing outstanding reporting and writing in any field of science."
- 1997: American Institute of Biological Sciences' Media Award that "recognizes outstanding reporting on biology to a general audience."
- 1999: The Pan American Health Organization's Award for Excellence in International Health Reporting
- 2004, 2009, 2012: American Association for the Advancement of Science's Science Journalism Award, awarded to honor "professional journalists for distinguished reporting on the sciences, engineering, and mathematics".
- 2007: National Academies of Sciences, Engineering, and Medicine's Science Communication Award, awarded to "recognize excellence in reporting and communicating science, engineering, and medicine to the general public", in the category Newspaper/magazine/internet
- 2015: National Association of Biology Teachers' (NABT) Distinguished Service Award, awarded to "recognize teachers for their expertise in specific subject areas, for contributions to the profession made by new teachers, and to recognize service to NABT, life science teaching, or leadership in learning communities."
- 2016: Society for the Study of Evolution's The Stephen Jay Gould Prize, awarded "to recognize individuals whose sustained and exemplary efforts have advanced public understanding of evolutionary science and its importance in biology, education, and everyday life in the spirit of Stephen Jay Gould."
- 2017: Online News Association's Online Journalism Award, awarded in the explanatory reporting category.
- 2019: Science in Society Journalism Awards from the National Association of Science Writers for his book, She Has Her Mother's Laugh: The Powers, Perversions, and Potentials of Heredity.
- 2021: Asteroid 212073 Carlzimmer, discovered by astronomers with the Mount Lemmon Survey in 2005, was named in his honor. The naming was announced by the International Astronomical Union on June 16, 2021. The number 212073 is an Easter egg for some of the properties of DNA (the first digit 2 for the double helix, followed by the nucleobases encoded as A=1, T=20, G=7, and C=3).

== Bibliography ==
=== Books ===
- Zimmer, Carl (1998). At the water's edge : macroevolution and the transformation of life. New York: Free Press.
- — (1999). At the Water's Edge: Fish with Fingers, Whales with Legs, and How Life Came Ashore But Then Went Back to Sea (First Touchstone ed.). New York: Touchstone.
- — (2000). Parasite rex : inside the bizarre world of nature's most dangerous creatures. New York: Free Press.
- — (2001). Evolution: The Triumph of an Idea.
- — (2004). Soul Made Flesh. Free Press.
- — (2005). Smithsonian Intimate Guide to Human Origins. New York: Smithsonian Books.
- — (2005). Where did we come from? An intimate guide to the latest discoveries in human origins. Sydney: ABC Books for the Australian Broadcasting Corporation.
- Darwin, Charles (2007). The descent of man : the concise edition. Selections and commentary by Carl Zimmer. Plume.
- Microcosm: E. coli and the New Science of Life London : William Heinemann Ltd., 2008 ISBN 0434016241
- The Tangled Bank: An Introduction to Evolution. Roberts, 2009, ISBN 1936221446
- Brain Cuttings: Fifteen Journeys Through the Mind. Independent Publishers Group, 2010, ISBN 1935622145
- More Brain Cuttings: Further Explorations of the Mind. New York : Scott & Nix, Inc., 2011 ISBN 1935622293
- A Planet of Viruses (2011) ISBN 0-226-98335-8
- Science Ink: Tattoos of the Science Obsessed (2011) ISBN 978-1-4027-8360-9
- Science Ink: Tattoos of the Science Obsessed. Reprint. Sterling: New York, 2014. ISBN 1454912405
- A Planet of Viruses. 2nd ed. University of Chicago Press: Chicago, 2015. ISBN 022629420X
- Evolution: Making Sense of Life. co-authored with Douglas Emlen. Roberts and Company; Greenwood Village, Colorado, 2016 ISBN 1936221365
- She Has Her Mother's Laugh: The Powers, Perversions, and Potential of Heredity. Dutton: New York, New York, 2018 ISBN 1101984597
- Life's Edge: The Search for What It Means to Be Alive New York: Dutton, 2021.
- Air-Borne: The Hidden History of the Life We Breathe New York: Dutton, 2025.

=== Essays and chapters ===
- Zimmer, Carl (July 1995). "Carriers of extinction". Discover. 16 (7): 28, 30.
- — (August 1995). "No Skycaps needed". Discover. 16 (8): 28.
- — (January 1996). "From fin to hand". Discover. 17 (1): 50–51.
- — (January 1996). "From teeth to beak". Discover. 17 (1): 50.
- — (January 1996). "Verdict (almost) in". Discover. 17 (1): 78–79.
- — (January 1996). "The State of the Earth : 1995". Discover. 17 (1): 80–81.
- — (February 1996). "Circus science". Discover. 17 (2): 56–63.
- — (April 1996). "Beetle of burden". Discover. 17 (4): 27.
- — (March 2010). "Fatal attraction". National Geographic. 217 (3). Photographs by Helene Schmitz: 80–95. Archived from the original on February 20, 2010.
- — (2006). "Making sense of evolution". In Diamond, Judy (ed.). Virus and the whale : exploring evolution small and large. Arlington, Va: NSTA Press.
- — (2006). "Evolution in seven organisms". In Diamond, Judy (ed.). Virus and the whale : exploring evolution small and large. Arlington, Va: NSTA Press.
- — (June 2013). "The mystery of the second skeleton". The Atlantic. 311 (5): 72–82.

=== Critical studies and reviews of Zimmer's work ===
She has her mother's laugh

- Flannery, Tim (March 7–20, 2019). "Our twisted DNA". The New York Review of Books. 66 (4): 38–39.
