= Plague Time: The New Germ Theory of Disease =

2002 book by Paul W. Ewald

- Author: Paul W. Ewald
- Language: English
- Subject: Evolutionary biology
- Publisher: Anchor Books
- Publication date: January 8, 2002
- Pages: 282
- ISBN: 978-0385721844
- Dewey Decimal: 616.07

Plague Time: The New Germ Theory of Disease is a non-fiction book by evolutionary biologist Paul W. Ewald. It argues that the role of pathogens has been overlooked in medicine, as a primary cause of many chronic diseases. It is his second book, following Evolution of Infectious Disease in 1994.

Collecting accounts from medical history, Ewald describes the ways in which infectious agents are underestimated, in favour of genetic or environmental causes of disease. As an evolutionarily biologist, he takes the long-term perspective of the virus or bacteria circulating in its lifecycle. Although much is known about the acute phase of infections, he argues we have systematically overlooked the medical effects of long-term infections.

== Overview ==
=== Part I: A sphere of infection ===
In part one, Ewald describes the lifecycle of different viruses, and the way this can manifest in medical disease. Respiratory viruses must spread between people in a short period of time before the immune system response, while sexually transmitted infections must maintain a longer lifespan in the human body, sometimes for one’s entire life. He also compares the trade-offs in lifecycle of diarrhea-born, vector borne, and hospital acquired infections.

Ewald argues against the aggressive application of the Koch postulate, which establishes a very high burden of proof for establishing an infectious cause for a disease. It is difficult to link an individual virus to a disease that manifests some decades later. He describes signs of arteriosclerosis first appearing asymptomatically in teenagers. He describes research linking T-cell Leukemia to an infection in mother's milk without manifestation until adulthood.

From an evolutionary point of view, genetic causes of chronic disease on their own, should be selected against in evolution. Likewise, twin studies should be much more compelling, and are not. Large exhaustive research projects like the war on cancer have also come up short. The onset of many diseases today is thought to be a combination of lifestyle and bad luck. Regarding diseases as part of a larger, stealthy, and patient lifecycle may be an opportunity to make progress against illnesses that have stymied research under other perspectives.

=== Part II: Infectious threats now ===
In part two, Ewald criticizes contemporary medical research for focusing on risk factors such as lifestyle and nutrition, and failing to see how these risk factors contribute to the lifecycle of an infectious agent.

- For heart disease, he points out that risk factors such as high iron levels, also benefit a culprit virus, such as Chlamydia pneumoniae - thought to be present in inflamed arteries.
- For arthritis, he points out that gene correlations such as apoE may contribute to helping the lifecycle of culprit viruses, as a primary cause of disease.
- For lung cancer, he speculates that smoking may damage the lungs ability to fight off infection, and a smokers cough may spread the virus, instead of secondhand smoke.
- For Alzheimer’s, he describes the work of Alan Hudson and Hervé C Gérard, who found strong correlations in brains with C. pneumoniae infections.

He also describes the search for the origin of the AIDS virus, and outlines the now discredited theory of an accidental origin in the 1950s polio vaccine.

=== Part III: Beyond the fear of infection ===
Although there have been some great successes in eradication campaigns, Ewald describes ways in which some interventions against pathogens may select for more harmful effects in the long term.

Instead of eradication, he favours strategies that push pathogens to become more benign. In HIV and Malaria for example, he describes how mosquito-proof housing functions to keep the very sick away from vector transmission, while allowing the more benign variants to spread. Similar effects are seen in cholera with water sanitation projects - new variants appear with less motivation to cause harmful diarrhoea symptoms.

He cites examples of the most aggressive sexually transmitted infections appearing during times of warfare, exactly when an aggressive strategy most benefits the pathogen. Mitigating the effects of infectious disease should involve shaping an evolutionary strategy for variants that do less harm. Likewise, vaccines should be designed to select for only the most dangerous properties of a pathogen, and serve to benefit benign variants of it.

== See also ==
Chronic diseases and cancers linked to infectious microbes
