= Evolution of Infectious Disease =

1993 book by Paul W. Ewald

- Author: Paul W. Ewald
- Language: English
- Subject: Evolutionary biology
- Publisher: Oxford University Press
- Publication date: December 1, 1993
- Pages: 320
- ISBN: 0-19-506058-X
- OCLC: 27221612
- Dewey Decimal: 616.9/0471 20
- LC Class: RC112 .E93 1994

Evolution of Infectious Disease is a 1993 book by the evolutionary biologist Paul W. Ewald. In this book, Ewald contests the traditional view that parasites should evolve toward benign coexistence with their hosts. He draws on various studies that contradict this dogma and asserts his theory based on fundamental evolutionary principles. This book provides one of the first in-depth presentations of insights from evolutionary biology on various fields in health science, including epidemiology and medicine.

== Infectious diseases ==
Infectious disease are illnesses induced by another organism. Such diseases range from mild to severe cases. The onset of infectious disease can be induced by bacteria, viruses, fungi, and parasites. Several examples of infectious diseases are as follows: tuberculosis, chickenpox, mumps, meningitis, measles, and malaria. Infectious diseases can be obtained through many routes of transmission such as inhalation, open wounds, sores, ingestion, sexual intercourse, and insect bites. Author, Paul Ewald used his book to expound upon infectious diseases in humans and animals, explain various routes of transmission as well as epidemiology as a whole. Epidemiology is defined as the study of the onset, distribution, and control of diseases. Evolutionary epidemiology focuses on the distribution of infectious diseases whereas Darwinian epidemiology focuses on human beings as hosts of infectious diseases. To fully comprehend both aspects of epidemiology, it is necessary to understand how organisms induce these diseases as well as how infected organisms counteract.

== Evolution ==
The extensive research about pathogens shows that they can evolve within a month, whereas animal hosts such as humans take centuries to make large evolutionary changes. Parasite virulence and host resistance are variables that strongly impact a pathogen's ability to replicate and be distributed to many hosts. Parasite virulence is the level of harm a host endures due to a virus, bacteria, or parasite. The way a host lives contributes heavily to how their body will react to pathogens. If an organism lives a moderately healthy lifestyle, including its diet, physical activity, and decreased stress, its chances of fighting off infectious diseases increase.

Host resistance pivots around how well a host's immune system can fight off a disease and rid their body of the pathogens. Although a healthy lifestyle can help a host, infectious diseases seem to evolve so quickly that a new generation of a disease may have emerged before scientists have the chance to make a vaccination for the first generation. Pathogens adapt to the medications and form a resistance to them which causes the new generations of pathogens to be more detrimental than the previous generations. After many generations have emerged, scientists must continuously form new vaccinations to combat the components of the disease that evolve every time a generation appears.

== Experimental data ==
Two sets of experiments were performed which tested the correlation of pathogens and declining organism populations as well as zoonotic pathogens being associated with emerging infectious diseases. The first experiment focused solely on a pathogen's ability to decrease or completely wipe out a whole population of organisms. In this experiment, researchers used Daphnia magna as the host and six microparasites were vertically transmitted to the host. Researchers Ebert, Lipsitch, and Mangin found that while pathogens and parasites do cause a change in a population, they do not have the ability to destroy an entire population. The pathogens did however have an impact on the host's fertility. Some females involved in the experiment were unable to reproduce after being infected with the microparasites.

The second experiment focused more on zoonotic pathogens being correlated with emerging infectious diseases in humans. The researchers comprised a database with separate infectious species, infectious pathogens that cause disease in patients with abnormal immune systems, and pathogens that have only been found in one case of human disease. The researchers broke this database down into five portions which were viruses, bacteria, fungi, protozoa, and helminths. Direct contact, indirect contact, and vector borne were the routes of transmission used. They found that 1415 zoonotic pathogen diseases have been found in humans.

== See also ==
- Plague Time: The New Germ Theory of Disease - Ewald's follow-up book, in 2002
