= Microcosm: E. coli and the New Science of Life =

2008 book by Carl Zimmer

- Microcosm book cover
- Author: Carl Zimmer
- Illustrator: Tadeusz Majewski
- Cover artist: M. Kristen Bearse
- Language: English
- Subject: Genetics
- Genre: Non-fiction
- Publisher: Pantheon Books
- Publication date: May 6, 2008
- Publication place: United States
- Media type: Hardcover
- Pages: 256
- ISBN: 978-0-375-42430-4
- Dewey Decimal: 579.3 42
- LC Class: QR82.E6 Z56 2008
- Preceded by: The Descent of Man: The Concise Edition (2007)
- Followed by: The Tangled Bank: An Introduction to Evolution (2009)

Microcosm: E. coli and the New Science of Life is a 2008 book by science writer Carl Zimmer. The book presents an overview of genetics research and genetic engineering by telling the story about the Escherichia coli (E. coli) species of bacteria which is omnipresent in the mammalian gastrointestinal tract. The title Microcosm refers to the notion that insights derived from the study of a relatively simple, single-celled organism like E. coli play in describing the fundamental features of all terrestrial life, including humans.

== Overview ==
Microcosm explores the history of E. coli's role as a popular organism to study for researchers that has revealed how genes work and are regulated giving insight into evolution, behaviour and ecology. Beginning at its discovery in 1885 by pediatrician and microbiologist Theodor Escherich, through isolation of the strain K12 by Edward Tatum, and leading to the numerous Nobel prize winning research based on the K12 strain and its progeny, the book recounts the large number of scientific discoveries that have relied on this simple organism. The book continues on to reviews of modern and ongoing research leveraging E. coli including details about research exploring cellular nanomachines such as flagella and the composition and utility of microbial biofilms.

== Evolution vs. intelligent design ==
The book makes the case that the flagellum and antibiotic resistance evolved and continue to evolve due to selection pressure. Zimmer devotes considerable attention to phenotypic plasticity and natural selection in E. coli genesis and notes that selection can be powered by humans individually (e.g., by antibiotic administration), collectively (e.g., by large-scale industrial food production), or inadvertently (e.g., by acting as host to a microbial pathogen). The book refutes the notion of intelligent design as the source of novel features of the organism, such as the flagellum that are capable of propelling E. coli, by exploring examples of more primitive, intermediate forms that, while useful, fall short of full utility of propulsion.

Though not a scientist himself, the acknowledgment section suggests that Zimmer’s theses have been vetted by multiple members of current E. coli researchers.

== Publication ==
Microcosm: E. coli and the New Science of Life was first published by Pantheon Books on May 6, 2008, in hardcover format. A Reprint edition in softcover was subsequently published in by Vintage Books in 2009.
