= Paul W. Ewald =

American evolutionary biologist (born c. 1953)

Paul W. Ewald (born c. 1953) is an American evolutionary biologist, specializing in the evolutionary ecology of parasitism, evolutionary medicine, agonistic behavior, and pollination biology. He is the author of Evolution of Infectious Disease (1994) and Plague Time: The New Germ Theory of Disease (2002), and is currently director of the program in Evolutionary Medicine at the Biology Department of the University of Louisville.

Ewald is known for his theories on the evolution of virulence and his theory that many common diseases of unknown origin are likely the result of chronic low-level infections from viruses, bacteria or protozoa. Ewald contended with the conventional wisdom that a "well-adapted parasite is a benign parasite," pointing out that this idea relies on group selection, and instead suggested that low virulence is only selected for if the pathogen relies on host mobility for transmission.

== Education and career ==
Ewald received his BSc in 1975 from the University of California, Irvine, in biological sciences and his PhD in 1980 from the University of Washington, in zoology, with specialization in ecology and evolution. He was formerly a professor of biology at Amherst College, and is currently director of the program in evolutionary medicine in the Biology Department of the University of Louisville.

== Ideas ==
Ewald asserts, along with a growing body of studies, that many common diseases of unknown origin are likely the result of chronic low-level infections from viruses, bacteria or protozoa. For example, cervical cancer can be caused by the human papilloma virus, some cases of liver cancer are caused by hepatitis C or B and the bacteria Helicobacter pylori has been proven to cause stomach ulcers. Ewald argues that many common diseases of currently unknown etiology, such as cancers, heart attacks, stroke and Alzheimer's, may likewise be also caused by chronic low-level microbial infection.

Ewald disagrees with the popular theory that genes alone dictate chronic disease susceptibility. Ewald, whose background is in evolutionary biology, points out that any disease causing gene that reduces survival and reproduction would normally eliminate itself over a number of generations. Ewald says that "chronic diseases, if they are common and damaging, must be powerful eliminators of any genetic instruction that may cause them." One example of this is schizophrenia; patients with this mental illness rarely reproduce. Ewald argues that, just by evolutionary pressures, schizophrenia would have already been eliminated if its causes were strictly genetic; he suggests that in the future, an infectious cause of schizophrenia will be discovered.

Ewald explains that purely genetic causes of chronic disease will persist only if a genetic instruction provides a compensating benefit (for example, the disease sickle cell anemia is caused by a genetic mutation that, in heterozygotes, protects against malaria, which kills millions worldwide each year).

Further evidence for a non-genetic etiology of diseases like schizophrenia, Ewald also points out, comes from concordance studies on identical twins, which measure the percentage of identical twins who both develop a disease. A concordance of 100% indicates a primarily genetic disease, which is not really influenced by environmental factors like infection, nutrition, or toxins. Huntington's disease, for example, has a concordance rate of 100%, indicating a predominately genetic etiology. However, when the concordance rate is lower, this indicates environmental factors like infectious microbes or toxin exposure are playing a causal role. Schizophrenia's concordance is approximately 35-60%, suggesting, says Ewald, that microbes are etiologically involved. Another example is breast cancer: Ewald notes that in the case of identical twins, when one twin develops breast cancer, the other twin has only a 10% to 20% chance of developing the disease, and this concordance rate of just 20% again indicates that environmental factors like infectious microbes or toxins are likely playing large causal roles in breast cancer.

Ewald's curiosity regarding the evolutionary process of infections was sparked by a bad case of diarrhea he had in 1977. His first thought during this bout was that his body was using diarrhea to expel the pathogen and he should avoid anti-diarrheal medication. Looking at the problem from the standpoint of the organism, expulsion was not an evolutionary benefit. The only benefit to the pathogen causing the sickness would be the potential transmission to other hosts; much like the particulate expelled during coughing, diarrhea can be a means of distribution. Another major influence on Ewald's thinking in evolutionary biology terms was the HIV virus, which once caught, initially remains inactive for years thus allowing it to spread, before the chronic disease of AIDS finally manifests, incapacitates, and eventually kills the host.

== Awards ==
In 2010, Utne Reader magazine named Ewald as one of the "25 Visionaries Who Are Changing Your World" for his research on the link between infections and cancers.

== Quotes ==
- "Like many great ideas in biology, the idea implicating infectious causation in chronic diseases, though simple, has far-reaching implications. It is so simple and so significant, that one would think it would have been recognized by many and would be the starting point for any discussion on the causes of disease. Not yet." — Paul W. Ewald.
- "If I were going to put my money on it, I would bet that by 2050—hopefully earlier—we’ll have found that more than 80 percent of all human cancer is caused by infection." — Paul W. Ewald.
- Of Ewald's theory: "It opens our eyes to many quite weird possibilities about disease that most medical scientists, tending to be unaware of current evolutionary thought, don't think of." — evolutionary biologist William D. Hamilton.

== Publications ==
=== Books ===
- Evolution of Infectious Disease (1994)
- Plague Time: The New Germ Theory of Disease (2002)

=== Articles ===
- "Transmission modes and the evolution of virulence" (1991)
- "The Evolution of Virulence: A Unifying Link between Parasitology and Ecology" (1995)
- "Guarding Against the MostDangerous Emerging Pathogens: Insights from Evolutionary Biology" (1996)
- "Vaccines as evolutionary tools: The virulence-antigen strategy" (1996) in Concepts in Vaccine Development
- "Alternative Transmission Modes and the Evolution of Virulence" (2002) in Adaptive Dynamics of Infectious Diseases
- "Virulence Management in Humans" (2002) in Adaptive Dynamics of Infectious Diseases
- Other publications by Paul Ewald on PubMed.

== See also ==
- Human Microbiome Project
- Koch's postulates
- Medical microbiology
- Chronic diseases and cancers linked to infectious microbes
