= Sexual selection =

Mode of natural selection involving the choosing of and competition for mates

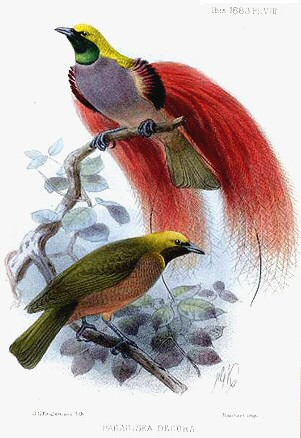
Sexual selection creates colourful differences between sexes in Goldie's bird-of-paradise. Male above; female below. Painting by John Gerrard Keulemans.

Sexual selection is a mechanism of evolution in which members of one sex choose mates of the other sex (intersexual selection) to mate with, and compete with members of the same sex for access to members of the opposite sex (intrasexual selection). These two forms of selection mean that some individuals have greater reproductive success than others within a population, for example because they are more attractive or prefer more attractive partners to produce offspring. Successful males benefit from frequent mating and monopolizing access to one or more fertile females. Females can maximise the return on the energy they invest in reproduction by selecting and mating with the best males.

The concept was first articulated by Charles Darwin who wrote of a "second agency" other than natural selection, in which competition between mate candidates could lead to speciation. His ideas were opposed by Alfred Russel Wallace, but supported with observations by George and Elizabeth Peckham and by Edward Bagnall Poulton late in the 19th century.

The theory was given a mathematical basis by Ronald Fisher in the 1930s, while experimental evidence was gathered later in work by Marion Petrie and others. Sexual selection can lead males to extreme efforts to demonstrate their fitness to be chosen by females, producing sexual dimorphism in secondary sexual characteristics, such as the ornate plumage of birds-of-paradise and peafowl, or the antlers of deer. Depending on the species, these rules can be reversed. This is caused by a positive feedback mechanism known as a Fisherian runaway, where the passing-on of the desire for a trait in one sex is as important as having the trait in the other sex in producing the runaway effect. Although the sexy son hypothesis indicates that females would prefer male offspring, Fisher's principle explains why the sex ratio is most often 1:1. Sexual selection is widely distributed in the animal kingdom, and is also found in plants and fungi.

== History ==
=== Darwin, Wallace, and Poulton ===
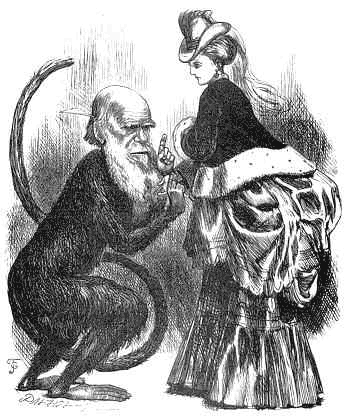
Victorian cartoonists mocked Darwin's ideas about display in sexual selection. Here he is fascinated by the apparent steatopygia in the latest fashion.

Sexual selection was first proposed by Charles Darwin in On the Origin of Species (1859) and developed in The Descent of Man, and Selection in Relation to Sex (1871), as he felt that natural selection alone was unable to account for certain types of non-survival adaptations. He once wrote to a colleague that "The sight of a feather in a peacock's tail, whenever I gaze at it, makes me sick!" His work divided sexual selection into male–male competition and female choice.

... depends, not on a struggle for existence, but on a struggle between the males for possession of the females; the result is not death to the unsuccessful competitor, but few or no offspring.

... when the males and females of any animal have the same general habits ... but differ in structure, colour, or ornament, such differences have been mainly caused by sexual selection.

These views were to some extent opposed by Alfred Russel Wallace, mostly after Darwin's death. He accepted that sexual selection could occur, but argued that it was a relatively weak form of selection. He argued that male–male competitions were forms of natural selection, but that the "drab" peahen's coloration is itself adaptive as camouflage. In his opinion, ascribing mate choice to females was attributing the ability to judge standards of beauty to animals (such as beetles) far too cognitively undeveloped to be capable of aesthetic feeling.

Darwin placed far more emphasis on sexual selection as a driver of evolution than any of his contemporaries. The concept of sexual selection and mate choice was highly ideologically unpalatable to many Victorians due to their implications for human, particularly female, sexuality. Further, animals such as insects were not considered intelligent enough to have an aesthetic sense and be able to perform mate choices based on small differences in display organs.

Drawing of a male Naphrys pulex spider dancing before female, in Edward Bagnall Poulton's 1890 The Colours of Animals

Edward Bagnall Poulton's 1890 book The Colours of Animals addressed sexual selection in birds, butterflies and moths, and spiders, and the possibility of an aesthetic sense in female birds. Poulton argued, for example, that in some spiders, citing the 1889 research of George and Elizabeth Peckham, the male displays and the female selects the male she prefers:

The female always watches the antics of the male intently, but often refuses him in the end, 'even after dancing before her for a long time'. Such observations strongly point towards the existence of female preference based on aesthetic considerations.

Poulton and Wallace disagreed on the mechanisms involved: Poulton argued against Wallace's views in the book, and Wallace wrote a critical review of the book in Nature, objecting especially to Poulton's proposal of an aesthetic sense.

=== Fisherian runaway ===
Ronald Fisher, the English statistician and evolutionary biologist, developed his ideas about sexual selection in his 1930 book The Genetical Theory of Natural Selection, taking up Darwin's ideas.

The main postulate of Darwin's theory of sexual selection, namely the exercise of sexual preference, will thus tend to be satisfied by the effects of previous selection. We may infer that the rudiments of an aesthetic faculty so developed thus pervade entire classes... In species so situated that the reproductive success of one sex depends greatly upon winning the favour of the other, as appears evidently to be the case with many polygamous birds, sexual selection will itself act by increasing the intensity of the preference to which it is due... —Ronald Fisher, 1930

These include the sexy son hypothesis, which might suggest a preference for male offspring, and Fisher's principle, which explains why the sex ratio is usually close to 1:1. The Fisherian runaway describes how sexual selection accelerates the preference for a specific ornament, causing the preferred trait and female preference for it to increase together in a positive feedback runaway cycle. He remarked that:

... plumage development in the male, and sexual preference for such developments in the female, must thus advance together, and so long as the process is unchecked by severe counterselection, will advance with ever-increasing speed. In the total absence of such checks, it is easy to see that the speed of development will be proportional to the development already attained, which will therefore increase with time exponentially, or in geometric progression. —Ronald Fisher, 1930

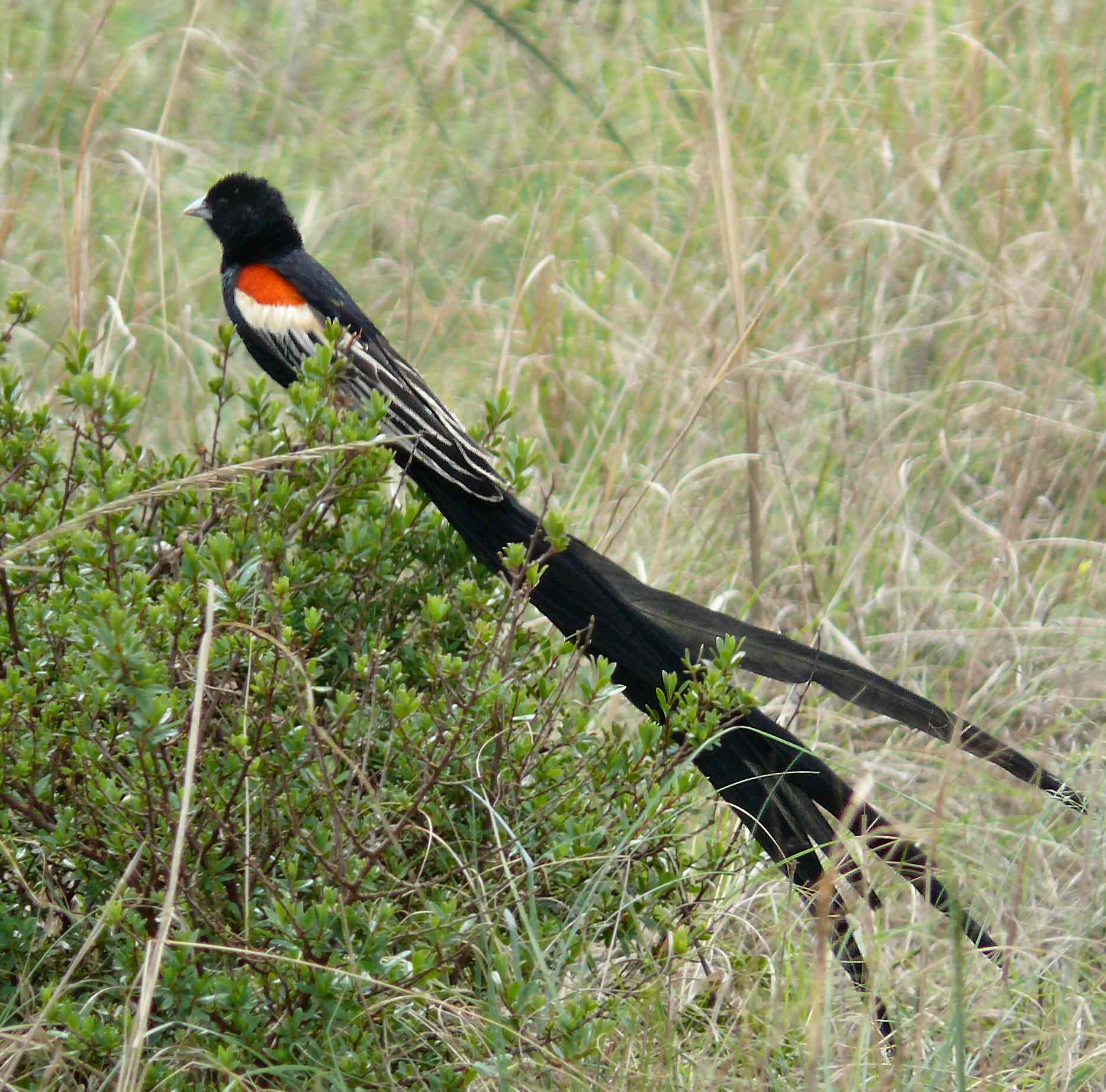
The exceptionally long tail of the male long-tailed widowbird has been suggested as an instance of a Fisherian runaway in response to female choice.

This causes a dramatic increase in both the male's conspicuous feature and in female preference for it, resulting in marked sexual dimorphism, until practical physical constraints halt further exaggeration. A positive feedback loop is created, producing extravagant physical structures in the non-limiting sex. A classic example of female choice and potential runaway selection is the long-tailed widowbird. While males have long tails that are selected for by female choice, female tastes in tail length are still more extreme with females being attracted to tails longer than those that naturally occur. Fisher understood that female preference for long tails may be passed on genetically, in conjunction with genes for the long tail itself. Long-tailed widowbird offspring of both sexes inherit both sets of genes, with females expressing their genetic preference for long tails, and males showing off the coveted long tail itself.

Richard Dawkins presents a non-mathematical explanation of the runaway sexual selection process in his book The Blind Watchmaker. Females that prefer long tailed males tend to have mothers that chose long-tailed fathers. As a result, they carry both sets of genes in their bodies. That is, genes for long tails and for preferring long tails become linked. The taste for long tails and tail length itself may therefore become correlated, tending to increase together. The more tails lengthen, the more long tails are desired. Any slight initial imbalance between taste and tails may set off an explosion in tail lengths. Fisher wrote that:

Sexual selection in the long-tailed widowbird. The female selects whichever male she prefers – one with a long tail, causing a runaway increase in tail length.

The exponential element, which is the kernel of the thing, arises from the rate of change in hen taste being proportional to the absolute average degree of taste. —Ronald Fisher, 1932

The female widowbird chooses to mate with the most attractive long-tailed male so that her progeny, if male, will themselves be attractive to females of the next generation—thereby fathering many offspring that carry the female's genes. Since the rate of change in preference is proportional to the average taste amongst females, and as females desire to secure the services of the most sexually attractive males, an additive effect is created that, if unchecked, can yield exponential increases in a given taste and in the corresponding desired sexual attribute.

It is important to notice that the conditions of relative stability brought about by these or other means, will be far longer duration than the process in which the ornaments are evolved. In most existing species the runaway process must have been already checked, and we should expect that the more extraordinary developments of sexual plumage are not due like most characters to a long and even course of evolutionary progress, but to sudden spurts of change. —Ronald Fisher, 1930

Since Fisher's initial conceptual model of the 'runaway' process, Russell Lande and Peter O'Donald have provided detailed mathematical proofs that define the circumstances under which runaway sexual selection can take place. Alongside this, biologists have extended Darwin's formulation; Malte Andersson's widely accepted 1994 definition is that "sexual selection is the differences in reproduction that arise from variation among individuals in traits that affect success in competition over mates and fertilizations". Despite some practical challenges for biologists, the concept of sexual selection is "straightforward".

=== A major driver of evolution ===
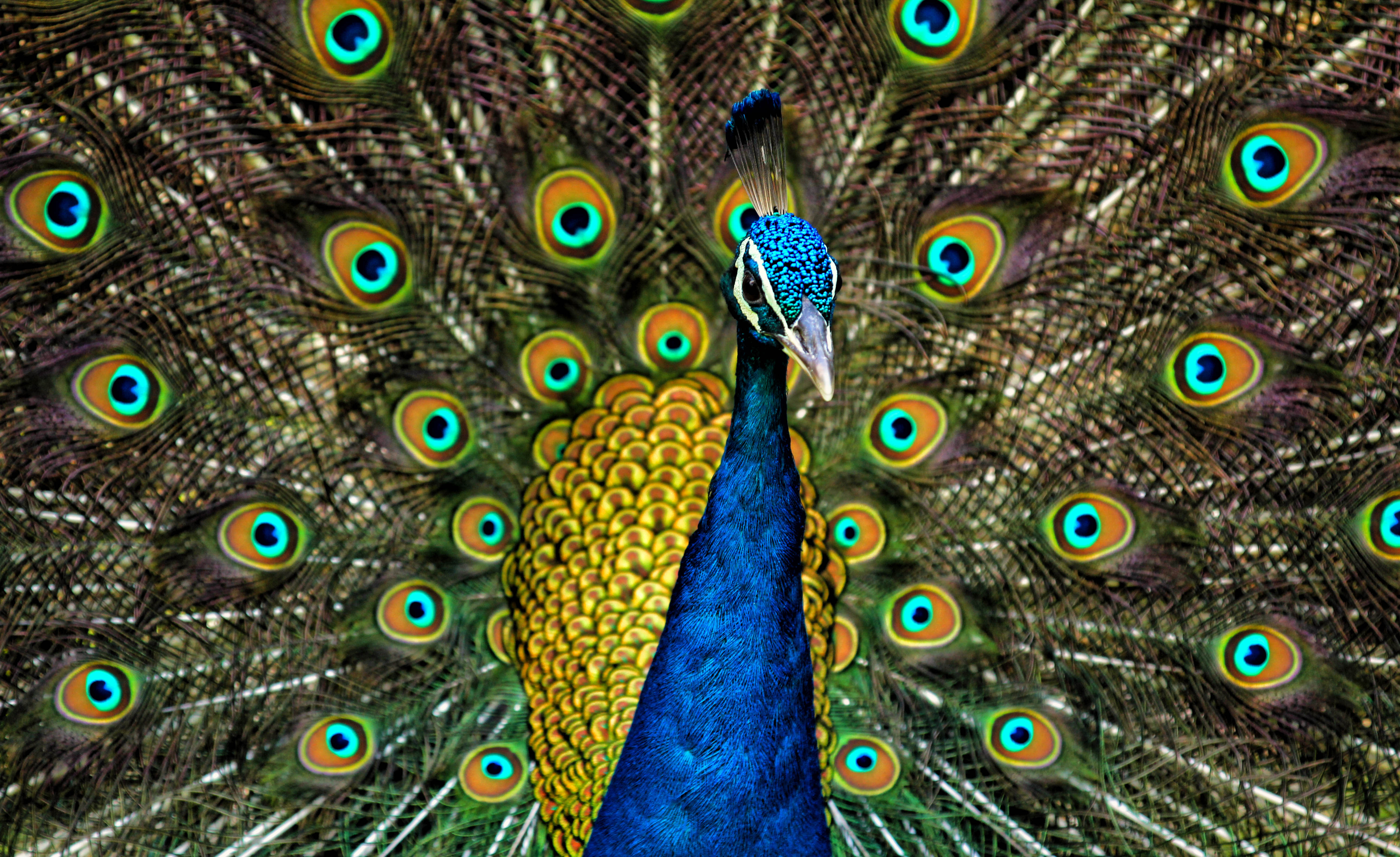
Marion Petrie showed that a peacock's reproductive success depended on the size and colourfulness of its train.

Darwin's ideas on sexual selection were not widely considered of great importance until in the 1930s biologists decided to include sexual selection as a mode of natural selection. Even during the modern synthesis, however, sexual selection was still widely seen as being of secondary importance, and many leading evolutionary theorists like George Ledyard Stebbins, George Gaylord Simpson, and Theodosius Dobzhansky devoted little attention to it. The mathematician Ronald Fisher was the main exception, as he studied sexual selection in detail during this era. Only by the 1960s and 1970s, thanks to Robert Trivers and other evolutionary biologists who examined sexual and other social behaviour in the context of evolution did biology shift towards an understanding of sexual selection as one of the major drivers of evolution. In the 1990s, Marion Petrie observed courtship behaviour and mate choice especially in the peafowl, demonstrating that the females selected males with gaudier plumage.

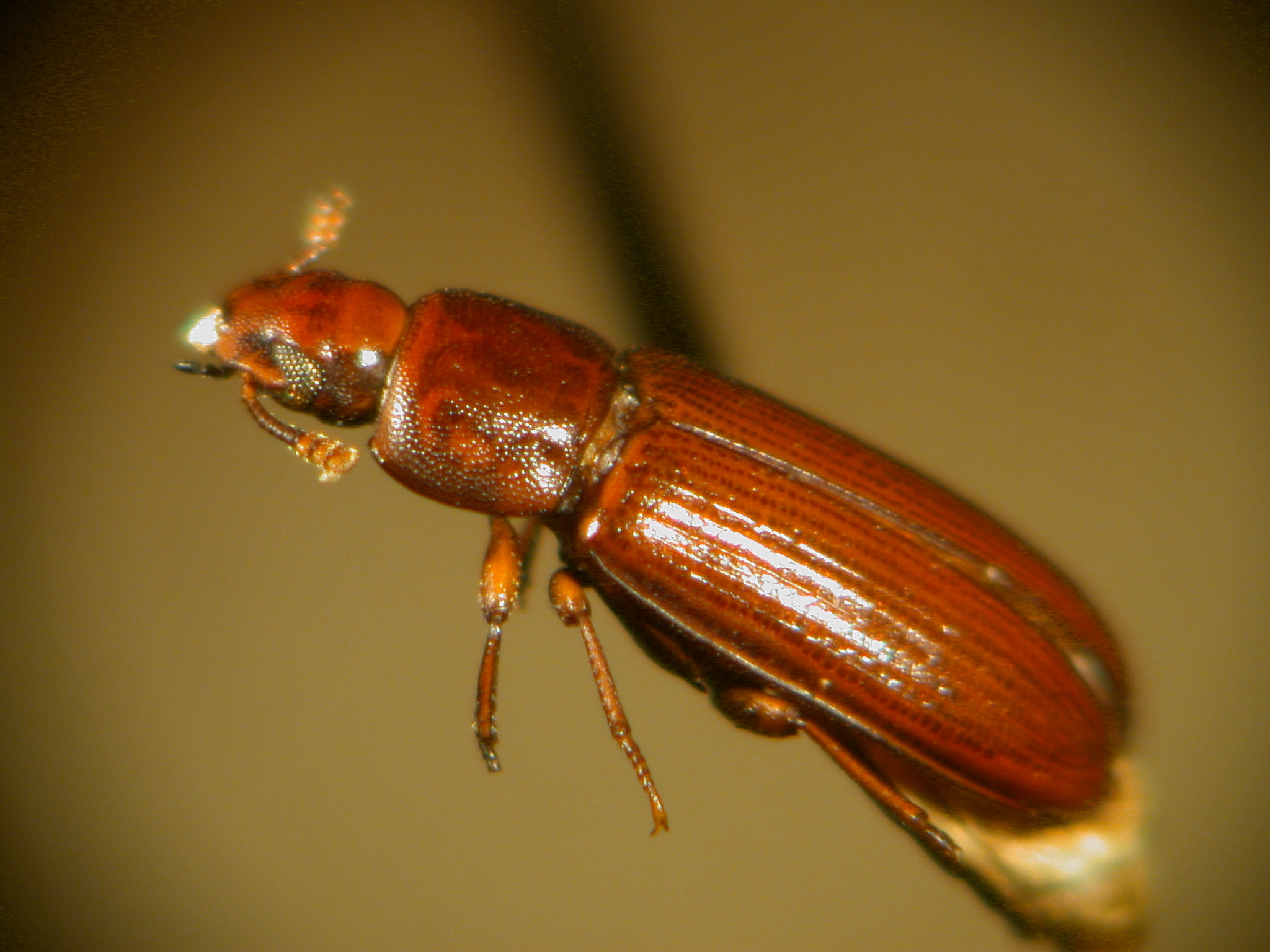
Sexual selection protected flour beetles from extinction in a ten-year experiment in the 21st century.

In the 21st century, sexual selection is seen as generally applicable and analogous to natural selection. A ten-year study, experimentally varying sexual selection on flour beetles with other factors held constant, showed that sexual selection protected even an inbred population against extinction.

== Modern theory ==
=== Reproductive success ===
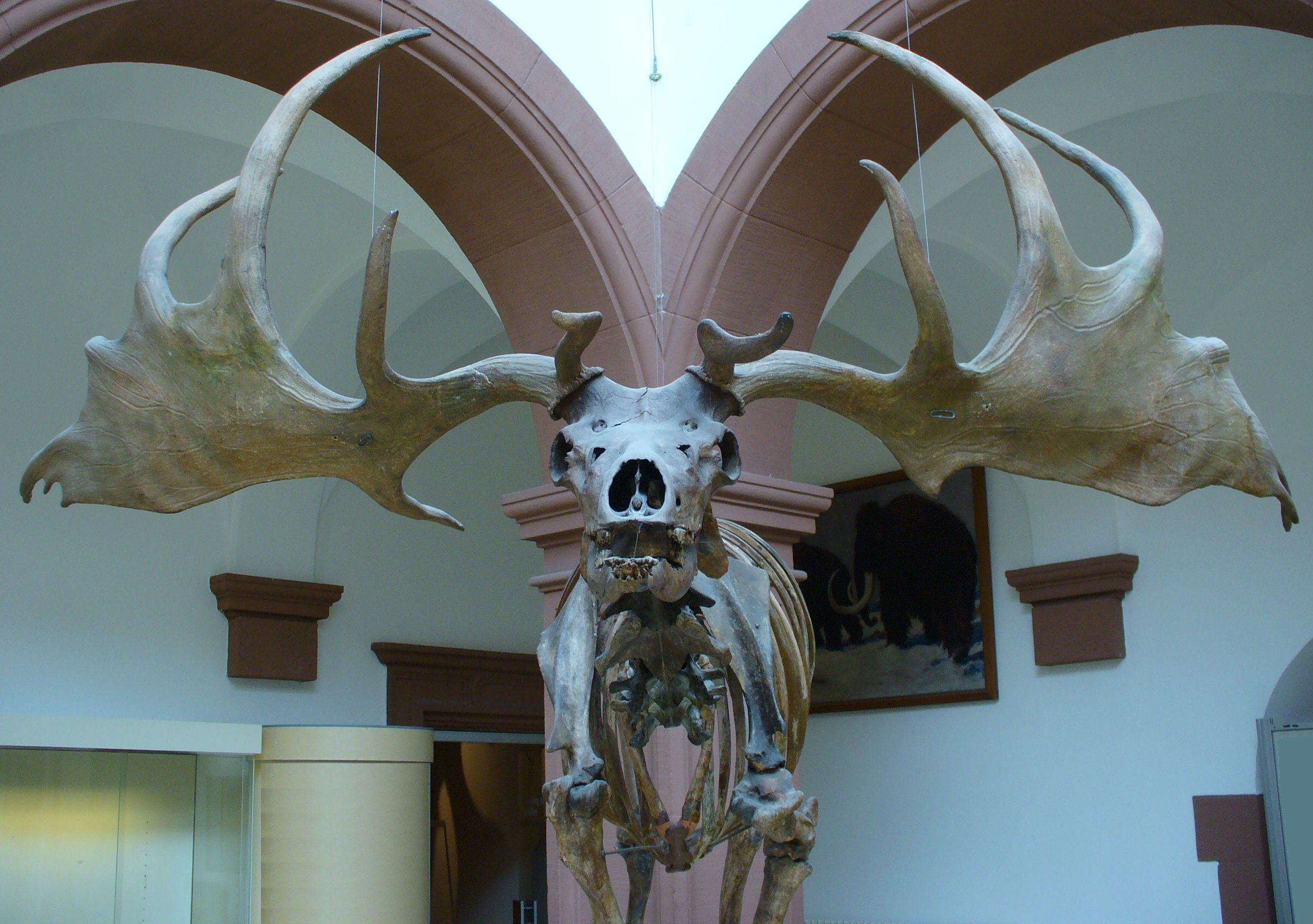
The enormous sexually selected antlers of the Irish elk might have helped it on its way to extinction.

The reproductive success of an organism is measured by the number of offspring left behind, and by their quality or probable fitness. Sexual preference creates a tendency towards assortative mating or homogamy. The general conditions of sexual discrimination appear to be (1) the acceptance of one mate precludes the effective acceptance of alternative mates, and (2) the rejection of an offer is followed by other offers, either certainly or at such high chance that the risk of non-occurrence is smaller than the chance advantage to be gained by selecting a mate. Bateman's principle states that the sex which invests the most in producing offspring becomes a limiting resource for which the other sex competes, illustrated by the greater nutritional investment of an egg in a zygote, and the limited capacity of females to reproduce; for example, in humans, a woman can only give birth every ten months, whereas a male can become a father numerous times in the same period. More recently, researchers have doubted whether Bateman was correct.

=== Honest signalling ===
The handicap principle of Amotz Zahavi, Russell Lande and W. D. Hamilton, holds that the male's survival until and through the age of reproduction with seemingly maladaptive traits is taken by the female as a signal of his overall fitness. Such handicaps might prove he is either free of or resistant to disease, or that he possesses more speed or a greater physical strength that is used to combat the troubles brought on by the exaggerated trait. Zahavi's work spurred a re-examination of the field and several new theories. In 1984, Hamilton and Marlene Zuk introduced the "Bright Male" hypothesis, suggesting that male elaborations might serve as a marker of health, by exaggerating the effects of disease and deficiency.

=== Male intrasexual competition ===
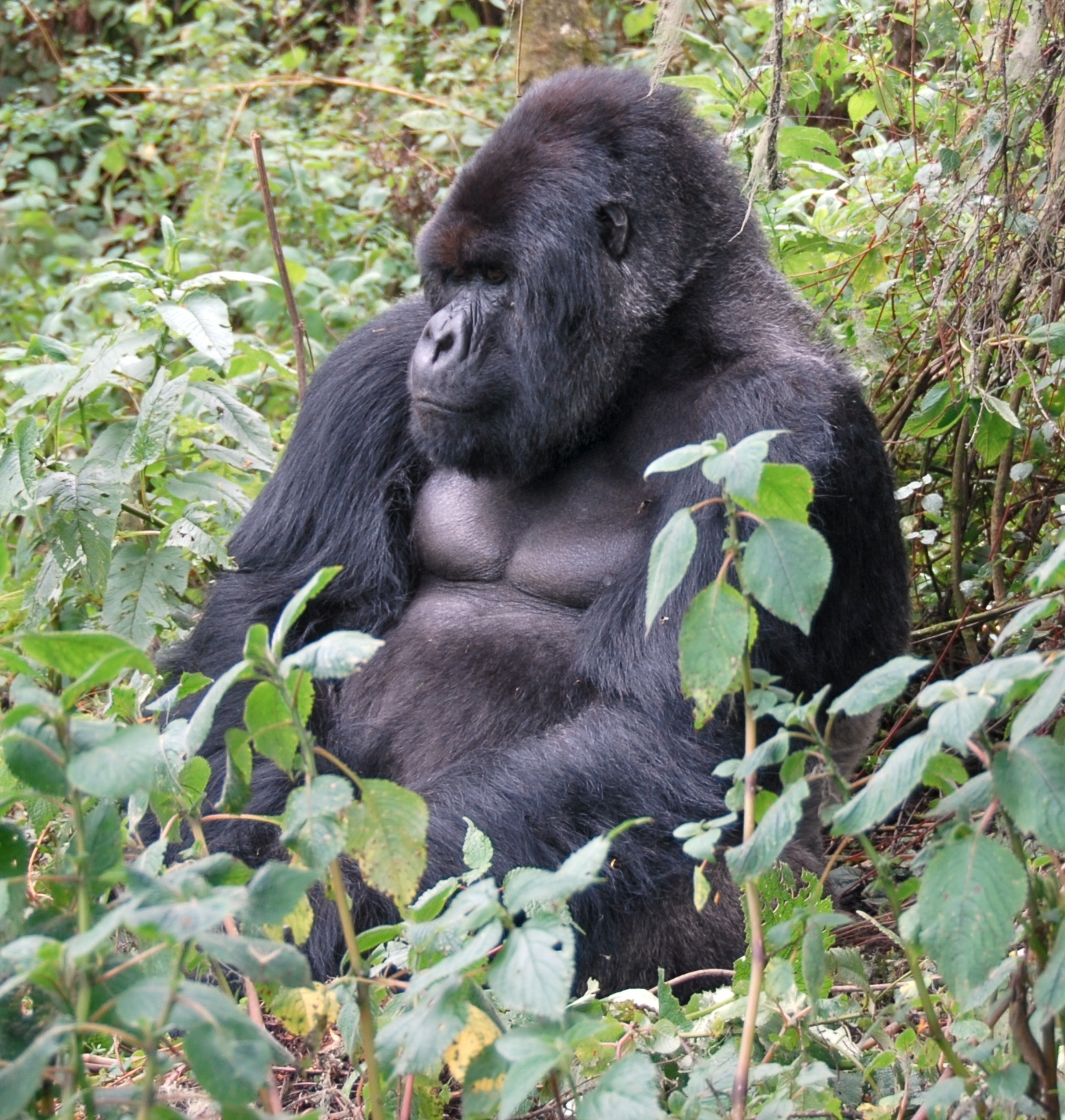
Male mountain gorilla, a species with very large males

Male–male competition occurs when two males of the same species compete for the opportunity to mate with a female. Sexually dimorphic traits, size, sex ratio, and the social situation may all play a role in the effects male–male competition has on the reproductive success of a male and the mate choice of a female. Larger males tend to win male–male conflicts. Males take many risks in such conflicts, so the value of the resource must be large enough to justify those risks. Winner and loser effects further influence male behaviour. Male–male competition may also affect a female's ability to select the best mates, and therefore decrease the likelihood of successful reproduction.

=== Multiple models ===
More recently, the field has grown to include other areas of study, not all of which fit Darwin's definition of sexual selection. A "bewildering" range of models variously attempt to relate sexual selection not only to the fundamental questions of anisogamy and parental roles, but also to mechanisms such as sex ratios – governed by Fisher's principle, parental care, investing in sexy sons, sexual conflict, and the "most-debated effect", namely mate choice. Elaborated characteristics that might seem costly, like the tail of the Montezuma swordfish (Xiphophorus montezumae), do not always have an energetics, performance or even survival cost; this may be because "compensatory traits" have evolved in concert with the sexually selected traits.

=== Toolkit of natural selection ===
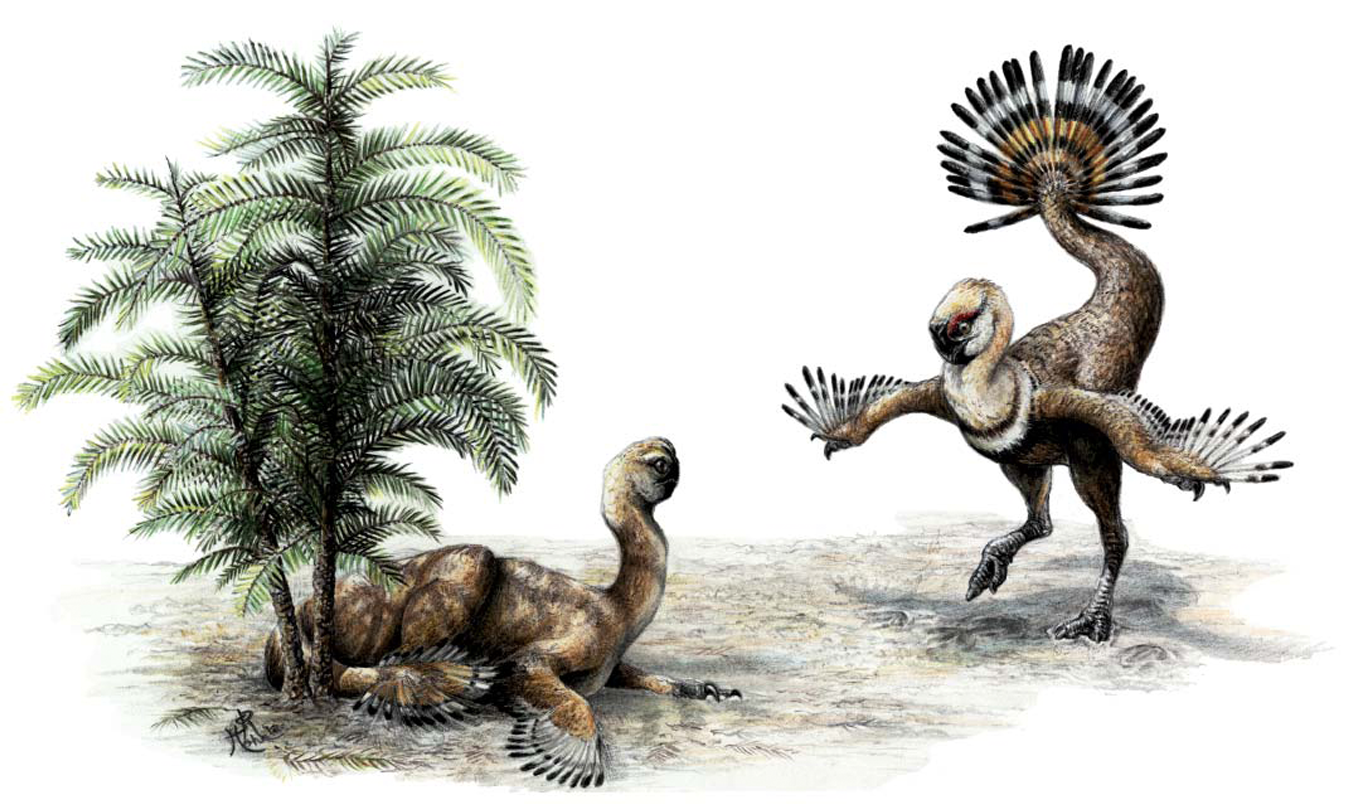
The feathers of flightless Heyuannia were perhaps used in courtship before being co-opted for flight.

Sexual selection may explain how characteristics such as feathers had survival value at an early stage in their evolution. Many non-avian maniraptors, such as Heyuannia, had well-developed wing feathers but could not fly. Feathers may have initially served as insulation and later served in incubating eggs and courtship. If maniraptors courtships combined displays of forelimb feathers with energetic jumps, then the transition to flight could have been relatively smooth as feathers were co-opted for flight.

Sexual selection may sometimes generate features that help cause a species' extinction, as has historically been suggested for the giant antlers of the Irish elk (Megaloceros giganteus) that became extinct in Holocene Eurasia (although climate-induced habitat deterioration and anthropogenic pressure are now considered more likely causes). It may, however, also do the opposite, driving species divergence—sometimes through elaborate changes in genitalia—such that new species emerge. Sexual selection often interacts with natural selection to drive speciation.

=== Sex role reversal ===
Darwin addressed sex role reversal in The Descent of Man, with females undergoing selection by male mating partners. Darwin and then others described reversed sex roles in the barred buttonquail (Turnix suscitator). Expected sex hierarchy norms were similarly subverted among pipefish (Syngnathinae) and seahorses (Hippocampus). Females of these species are generally larger, more colorful, and more aggressive than males. In moths, females usually advertise for females by releasing pheromones, to which males "assemble" from long range. In the Ghost Swift moth, the sex roles have been argued to be reversed, because the males lek, hovering together in groups and release pheromones from hind-tibial brush organs. The females often aggressively knock males from the air whereupon copulation takes place.

=== Competition between members of the same species ===
Nowadays, biologists say that certain evolutionary traits can be explained by competition between members of the same species. Competition can be before or after sexual intercourse. Direct fitness evidence from gene knockdown experiments in D. melanogaster revealed strong signals of antagonistic selection favoring males that acquire new genes with increased fitness effects, when express in somatic tissues, at cost of female fitness. Meanwhile, the females were also detected to gain fitness effects when acquire new genes that express in germline tissues at cost of male benefits. These findings suggest competition between members of both males and females for somatic and germline functions respectively.

== Taxonomic distribution ==
Sexual selection is widely distributed among the eukaryotes, occurring in plants, fungi, and animals. Since Darwin's pioneering observations on humans, it has been studied intensively among the insects, spiders, amphibians, reptiles, birds, and mammals, revealing many distinctive behaviours and physical adaptations.

=== In mammals ===
Darwin conjectured that heritable traits such as beards, hairlessness, and steatopygia in different human populations are results of sexual selection in humans. Humans are sexually dimorphic; females select males using factors including voice pitch, facial shape, muscularity, and height.

Among the many instances of sexual selection in mammals is extreme sexual dimorphism, with males as much as six times heavier than females, and male fighting for dominance among elephant seals. Dominant males establish large harems of several dozen females; unsuccessful males may attempt to copulate with a harem male's females if the dominant male is inattentive. This forces the harem male to defend his territory continuously, not feeding for as much as three months.

Also seen in mammals is sex-role reversal, as in the highly social meerkats, where a large female is dominant within a pack, and female–female competition is observed. The dominant female produces most of the offspring; the subordinate females are nonbreeding, providing altruistic care to the young.

Example sexual selection mechanisms in mammals

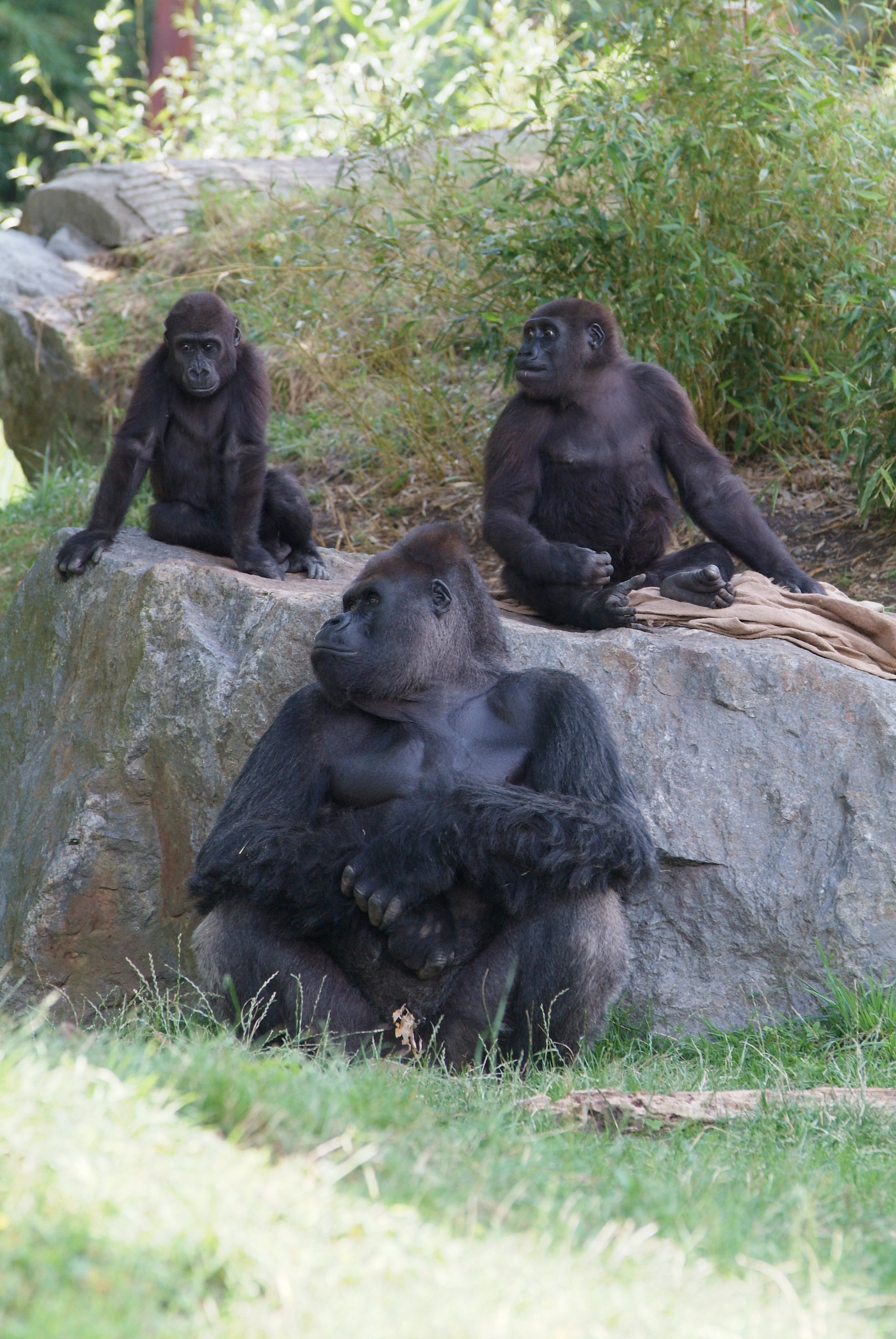
Among mammals, the male gorilla is much larger than the female.

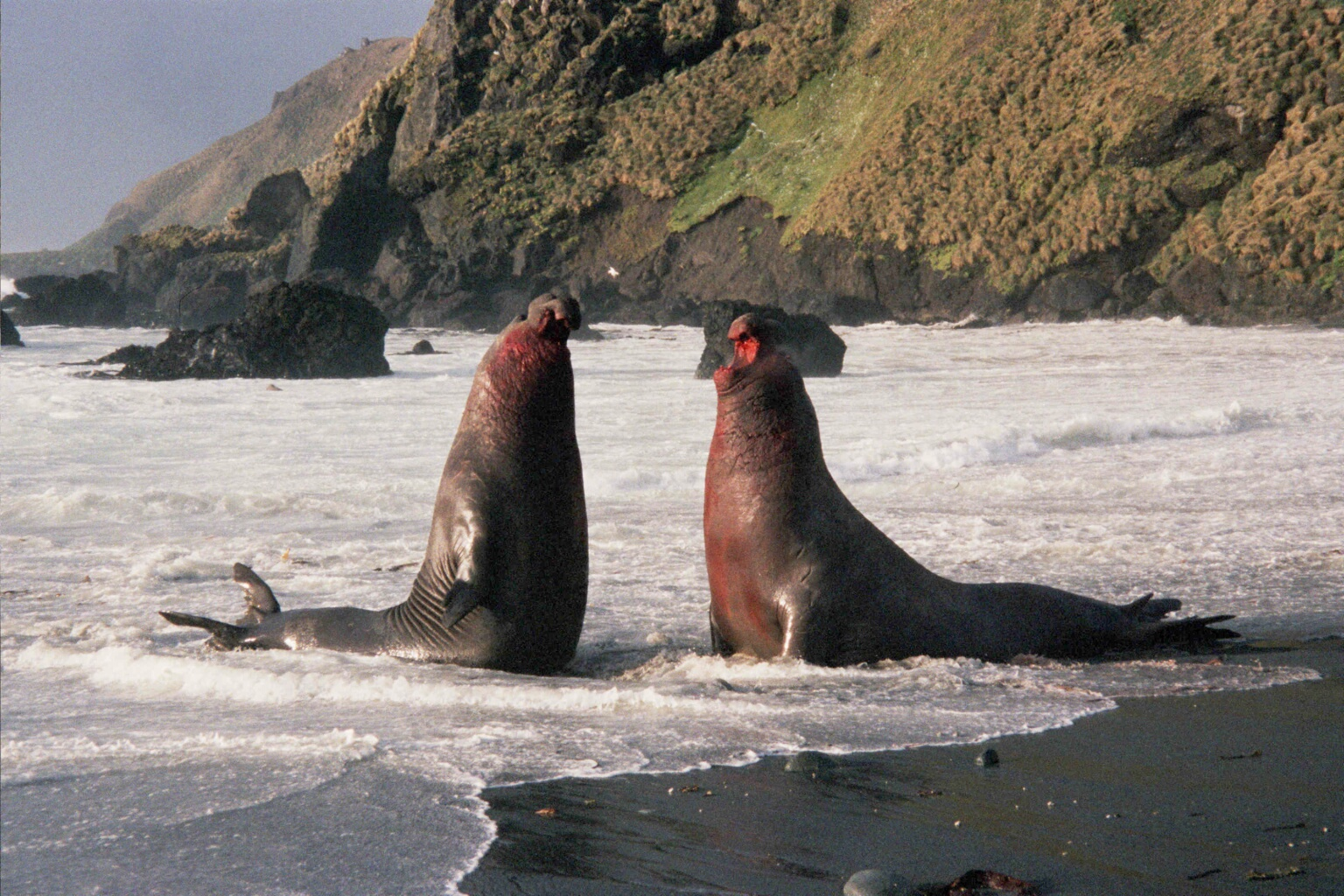
Male southern elephant seals fighting on Macquarie Island for the chance to mate

=== In arthropods ===
Sexual selection occurs in a wide range of spider species, both before and after copulation. Post-copulatory sexual selection involves sperm competition and cryptic female choice. Sperm competition occurs where the sperm of more than one male competes to fertilise the egg of the female. Cryptic female choice involves the expelling of a male's sperm during or after copulations.

Many forms of sexual selection exist among the insects. Parental care is often provided by female insects, as in bees, but male parental care is found in belostomatid water bugs, where the male, after fertilizing the eggs, allows the female to glue her eggs onto his back. He broods them until the nymphs hatch 2–4 weeks later. The eggs are large and reduce the ability of the male to fertilise other females and catch prey, and increases its predation risk.

Among the fireflies (Lampyrid beetles), males fly in darkness and emit a species-specific pattern of light flashes, which are answered by perching receptive females. The colour and temporal variation of the flashes contribute to success in attracting females. Among the beetles, sexual selection is common. In the mealworm beetle, Tenebrio molitor, males release pheromones to attract females to mate. Females choose mates based on whether they are infected, and on their mass.

Example sexual selection mechanisms in arthropods

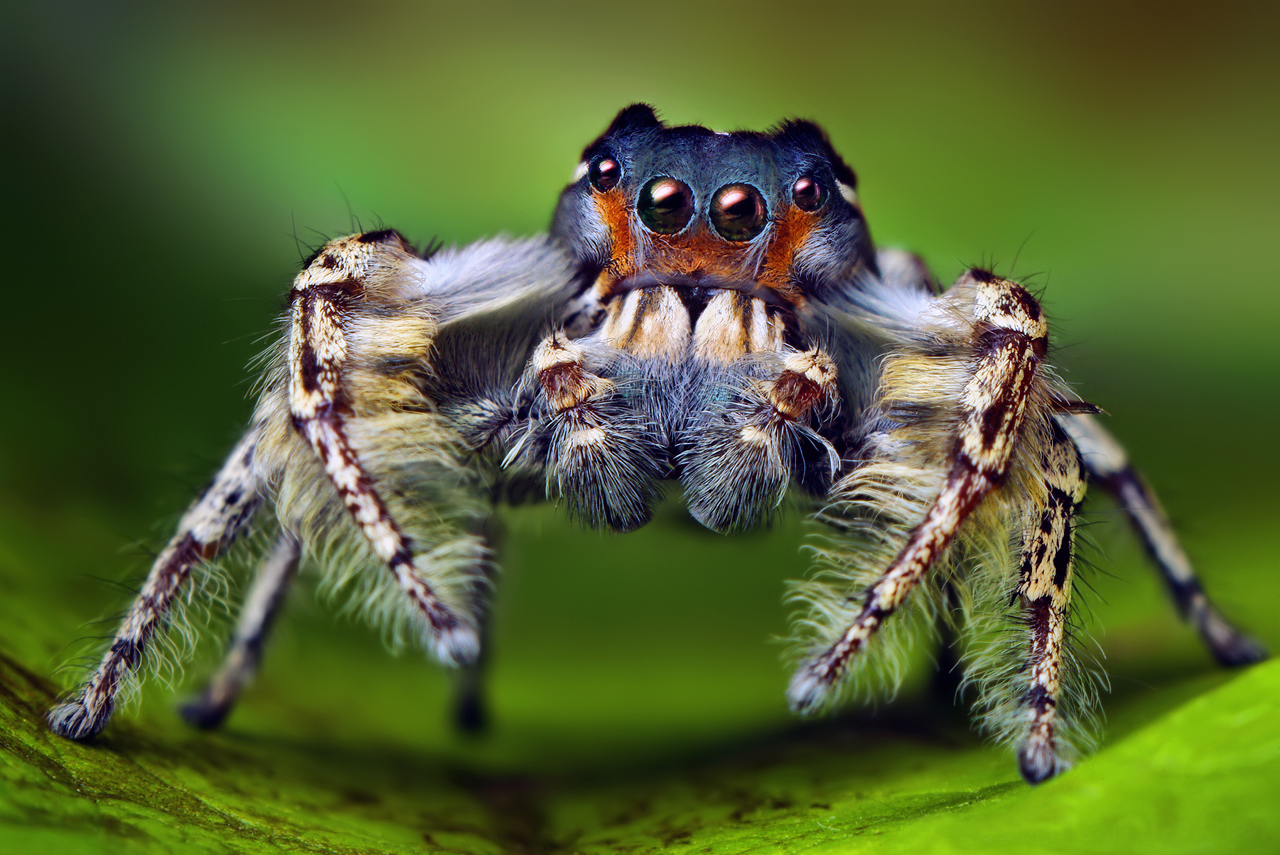
Males of many spiders, such as this Phidippus putnami, have elaborate courtship displays.

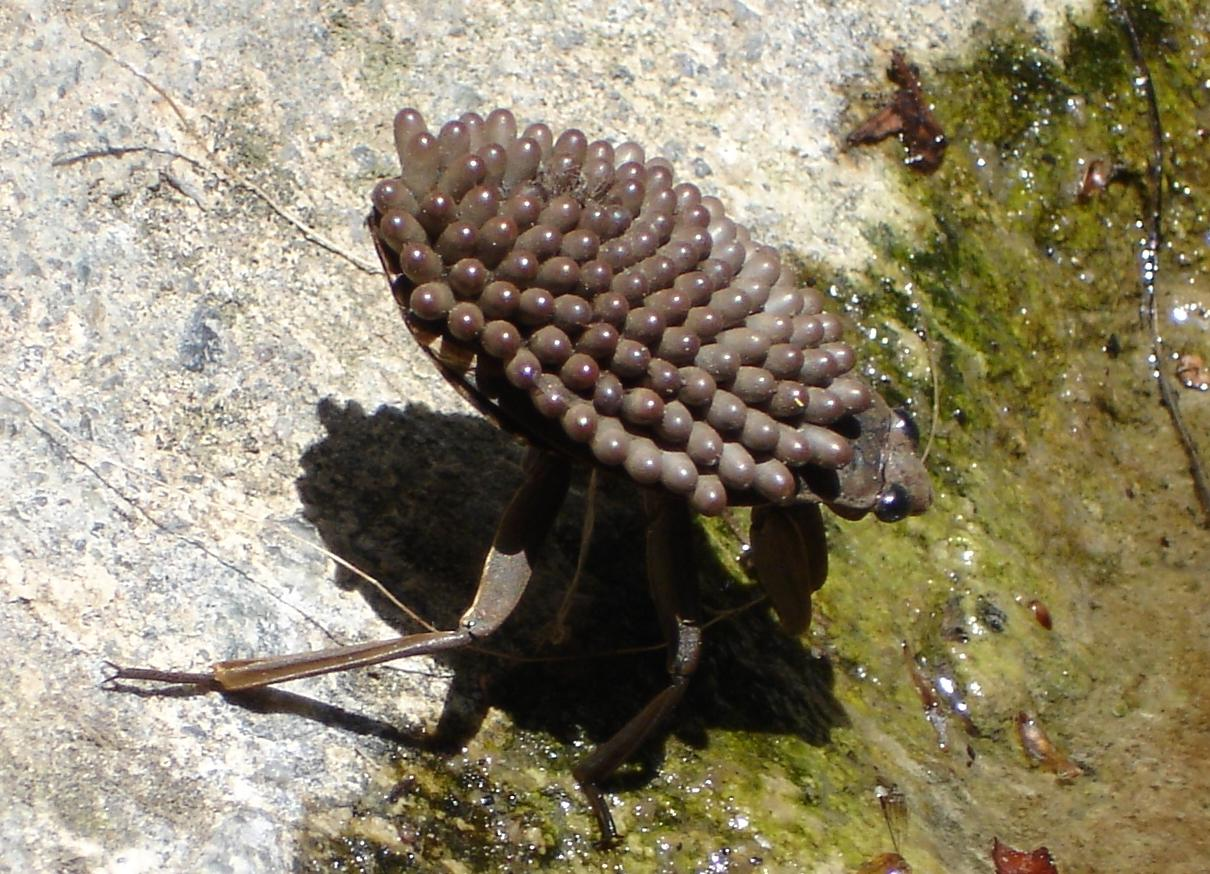
A male Abedus indentatus belostomatid bug carries eggs on its back.

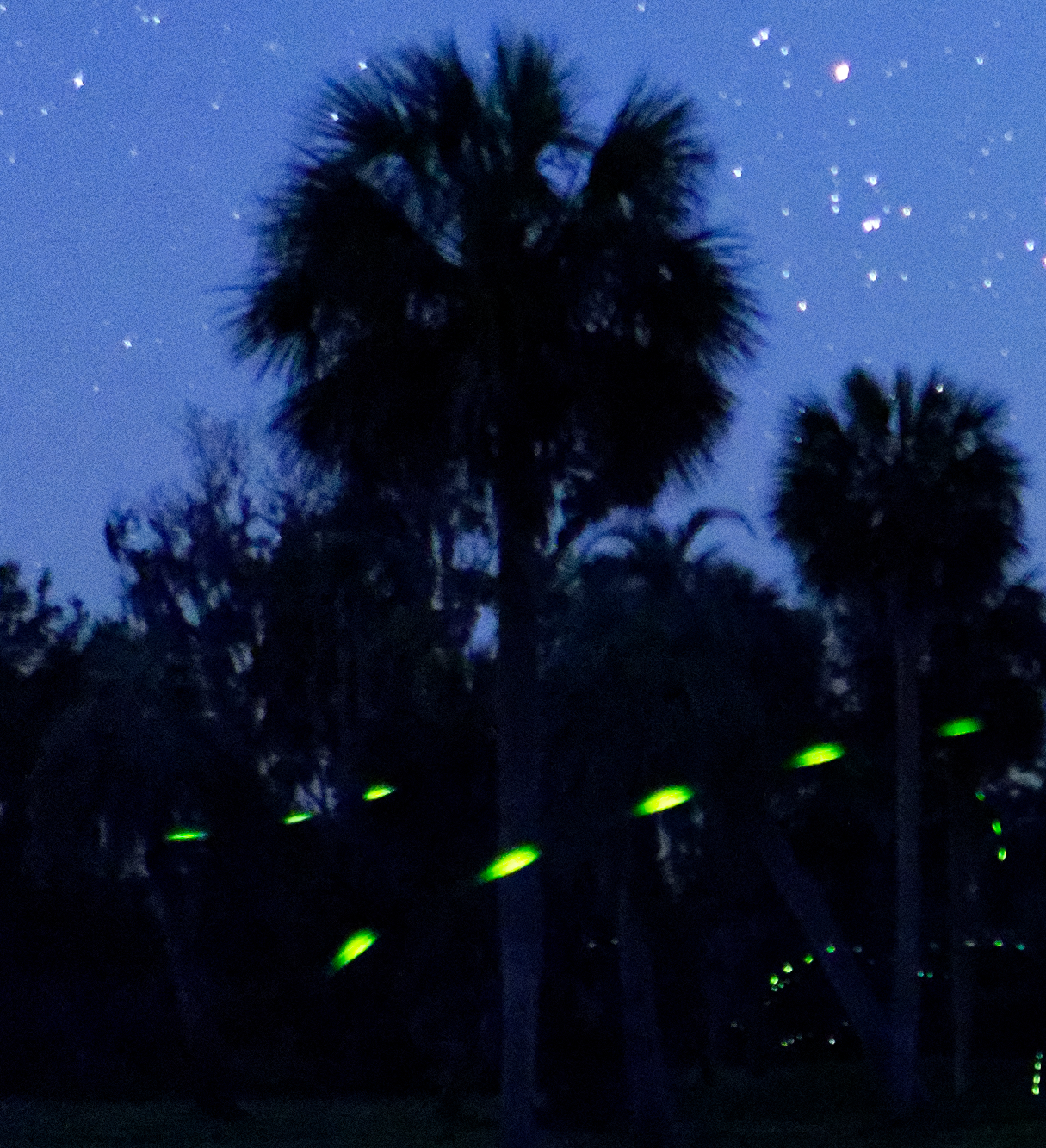
Each firefly species attracts mates with its own flash pattern.

=== In molluscs ===
Postcopulatory intersexual selection occurs in Idiosepius paradoxus, the Japanese pygmy squid. Males place their spermatangia on an external location on the female's body. The female physically removes spermatangia of males she is presumed to favour less.

=== In amphibians and reptiles ===
Many amphibians have annual breeding seasons with male–male competition. Males arrive at the water's edge first in large numbers, and produce a wide range of vocalizations to attract mates. Among frogs, the fittest males have the deepest croaks and the best territories; females select their mates at least partly based on the depth of croaking. This has led to sexual dimorphism, with females larger than males in 90% of species, and male fighting to access females. Spikethumb frogs are suggested to engage in male-male competition with their elongated prepollex to maintain their mating site. The prepollex, which serves as a rudimentary digit, contains a projecting spine that may be used during this combat, leaving scars on the heads and forelimbs of other males.

Many different tactics are used by snakes to acquire mates. Ritual combat between males for the females they want to mate with includes topping, a behaviour exhibited by most viperids, in which one male twists around the vertically elevated fore body of its opponent and forcing it downward. Neck biting is common while the snakes are entwined.

Example sexual selection mechanisms in amphibians and reptiles

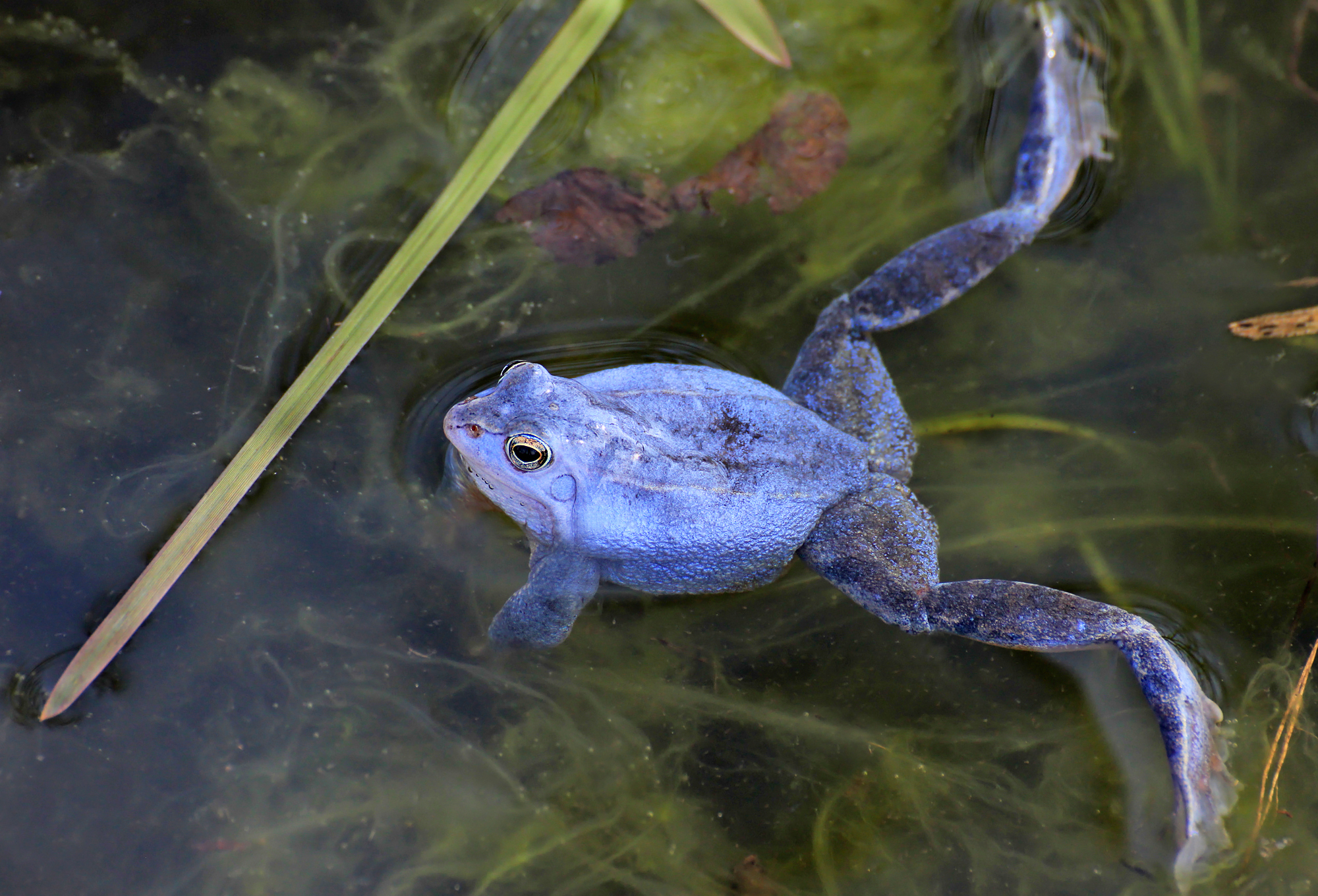
Male moor frogs become blue to signal their fitness to females.

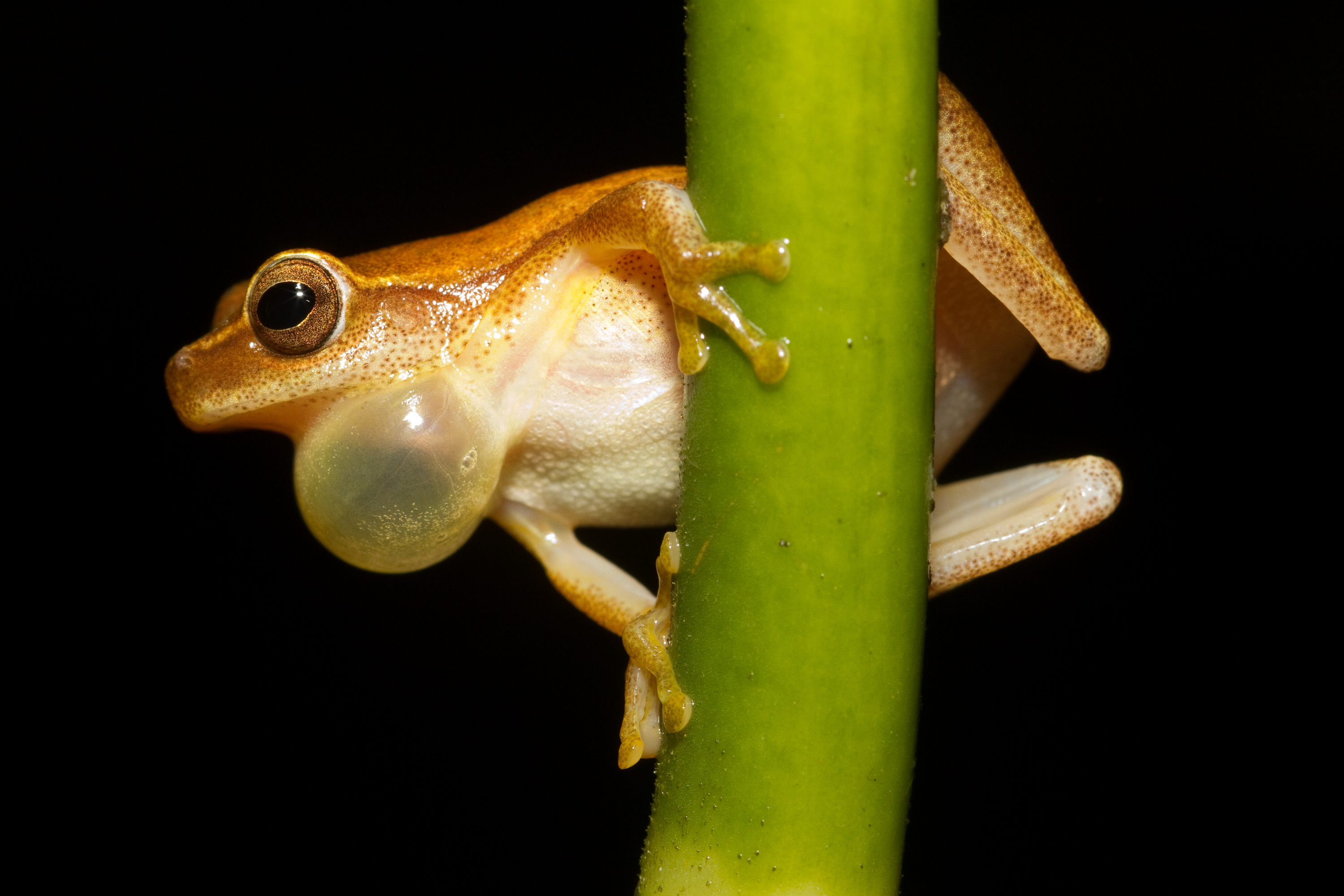
Male Dendropsophus microcephalus calling

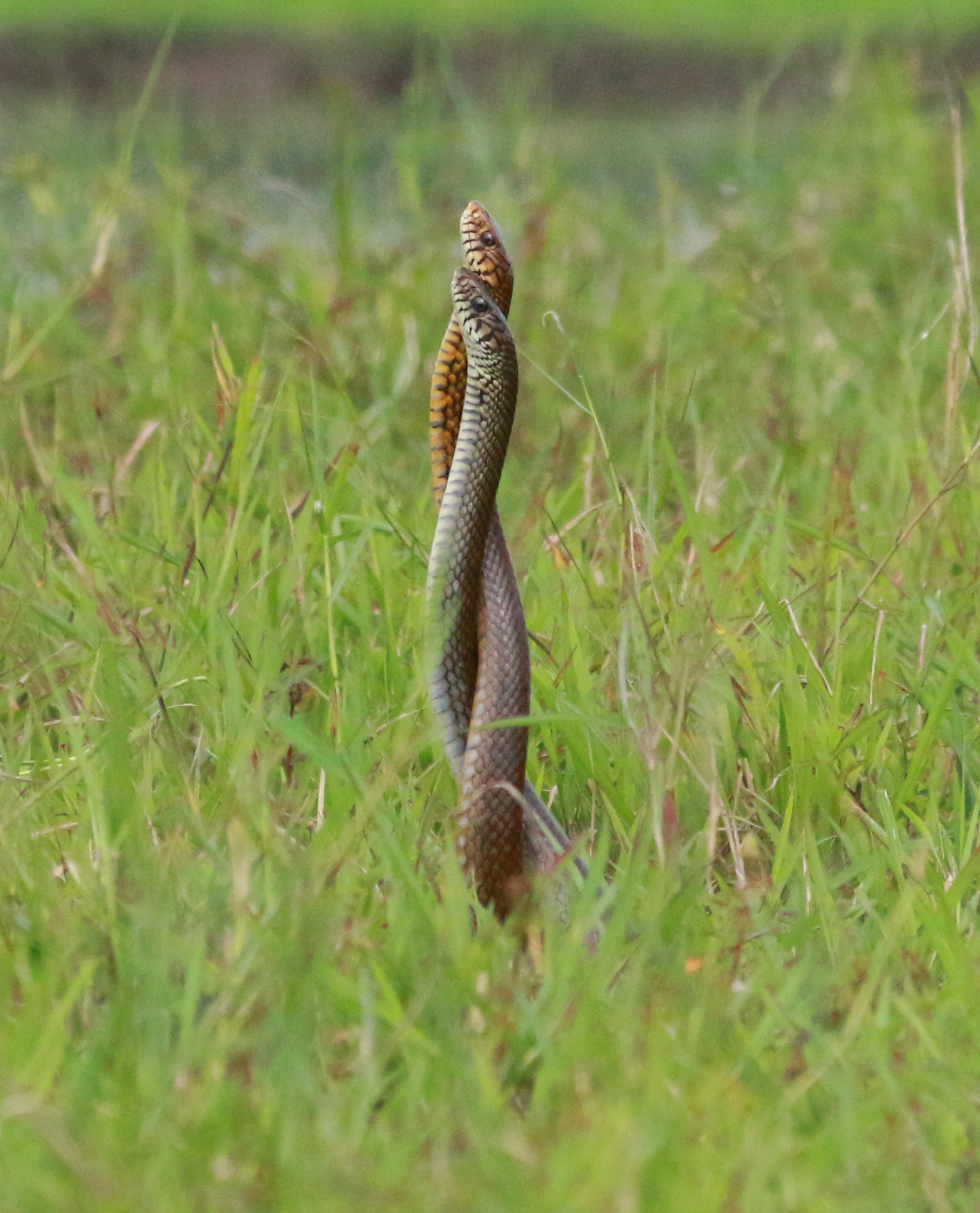
Territorial fight in the Indian rat snake, Ptyas mucosa

=== In birds ===
Birds have evolved a wide variety of mating behaviours and many types of sexual selection. These include intersexual selection (female choice) and intrasexual competition, where individuals of the more abundant sex compete with each other for the privilege to mate. Many species, notably the birds-of-paradise, are sexually dimorphic. Males with the brightest plumage are favoured by females of multiple species of bird.

Many bird species make use of mating calls, the females preferring males with songs that are complex and varied in amplitude, structure, and frequency. Larger males have deeper songs and increased mating success.

Example sexual selection mechanisms in birds

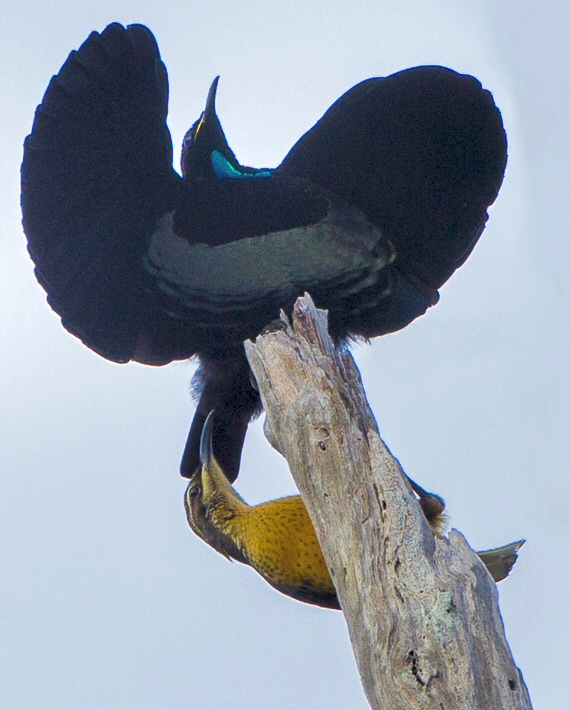
Male Victoria's riflebird displaying to a female

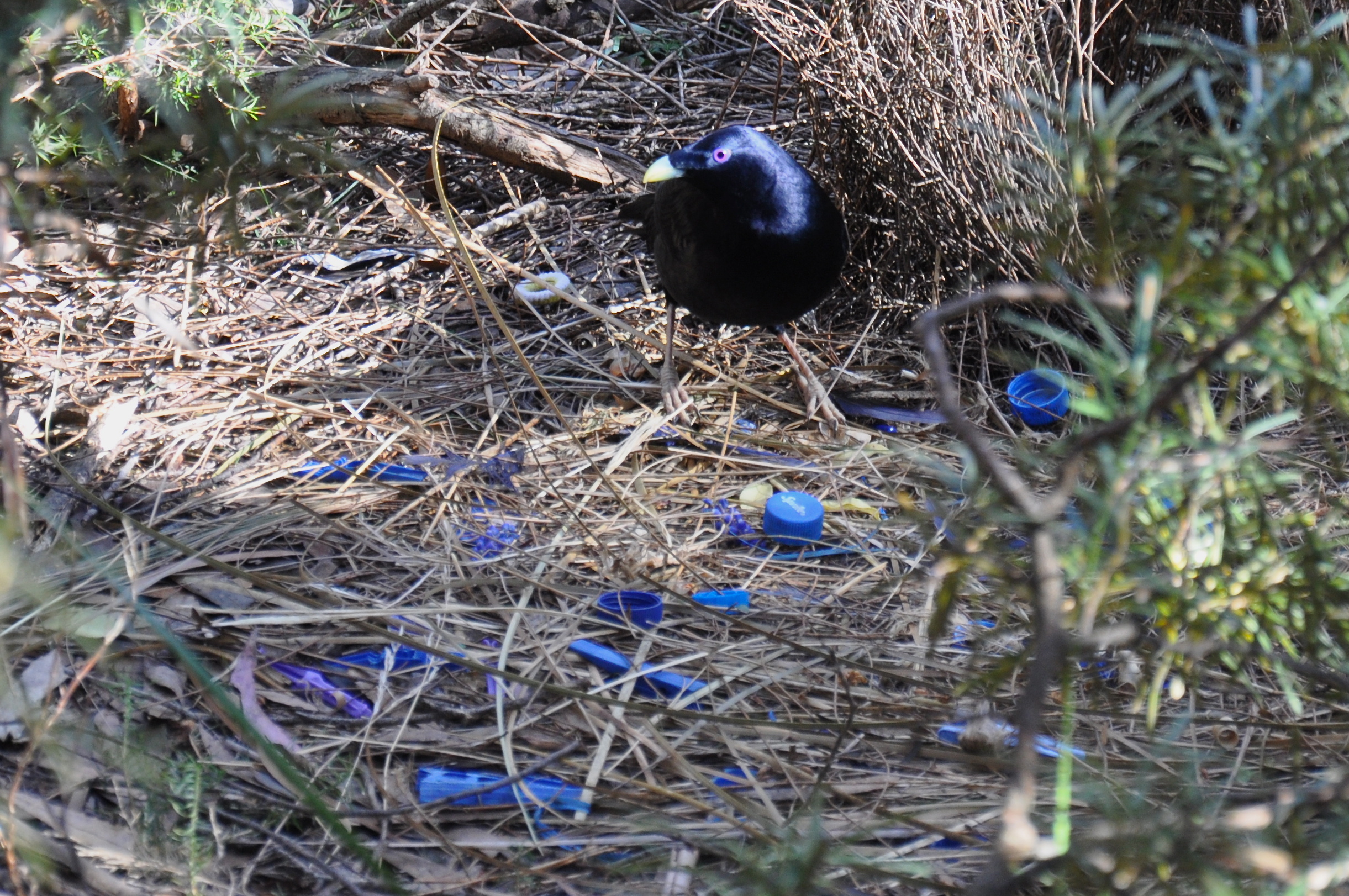
A male satin bowerbird guards its bower from rival males in the hope of attracting females with its decorations.

=== In plants and fungi ===
Flowering plants have many secondary sexual characteristics subject to sexual selection including floral symmetry if pollinators visit flowers assortatively by degree of symmetry, nectar production, floral structure, and inflorescences, as well as sexual dimorphisms.

Fungi appear to make use of sexual selection, although they also often reproduce asexually. In the Basidiomycetes, the sex ratio is biased towards males, implying sexual selection there. Male–male competition to fertilise occurs in fungi including yeasts. Pheromone signaling is used by female gametes and by conidia, implying male choice in these cases. Female–female competition may also occur, indicated by the much faster evolution of female-biased genes in fungi.

Example sexual selection mechanisms in plants

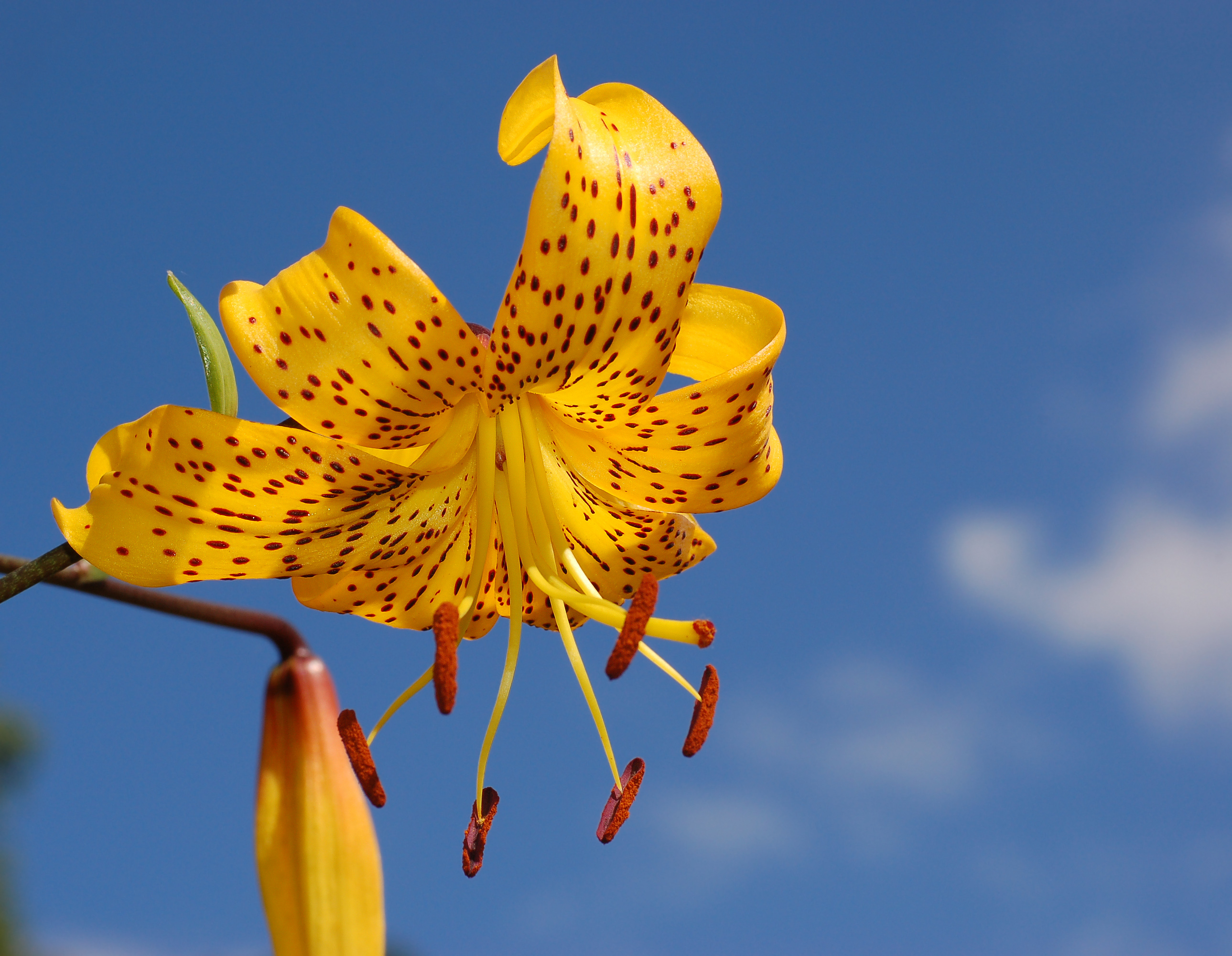
Citronella flower's symmetry may have been subject to sexual selection by its pollinators.
