= The Crucible of Creation =

1998 book by Simon Conway Morris

- Cover showing Anomalocaris (reconstruction)
- Author: Simon Conway Morris
- Language: English
- Subjects: Palaeontology; Evolutionary biology
- Genre: Science book
- Publisher: Oxford University Press
- Publication date: 1998
- Publication place: United Kingdom
- Media type: Print (Hardcover and Paperback)
- Pages: 242
- ISBN: 0-19-850256-7
- OCLC: 37341317
- Dewey Decimal: 562/.09711/68
- LC Class: QE770.C67
- Followed by: Life's Solution: Inevitable Humans in a Lonely Universe

The Crucible of Creation: The Burgess Shale and the Rise of Animals is a 1998 book by Simon Conway Morris, an English palaeontologist and evolutionary biologist at the University of Cambridge. It tells the scientific research on Cambrian explosion from the discoveries of Burgess Shale fauna in British Columbia, Canada, and the implications of the fossils in understanding the broad concept of evolution of life. Starting his PhD research on the Burgess Shale fossil, Conway Morris contributed to the correct identification and discovery of many Cambrian animals.

The book was written as a rebuttal of Stephen Jay Gould's Wonderful Life (1989), a book which popularised the concept and story of Cambrian explosion to the public. It criticises many of the scientific accounts on the fossils, particularly on their interpretations, and moreover, the philosophical conclusion drawn by Gould. Discussing evolution from theistic view, it started the lingering scientific debate on the concepts of evolutionary contingency and convergence, extending to philosophical and theological disputes. It was followed by several books on the same theme, the collective works of which earned Conway Morris the Templeton Prize in 2026.

== Background ==
In 1886, Richard G. McConnell of the Geological Survey of Canada several fossils including those of trilobites and unknown species at the Stephen Formation in British Columbia, Canada. In 1892, paleontologist Joseph Frederick Whiteaves identified one of the fossils that looked like a giant shrimp as Anomalocaris (from ανώμαλος, unlike,—καρίς, a shrimp, i.e., unlike other shrimps). American palaeontologist Charles Doolittle Walcott, then Secretary of the Smithsonian Institution, was inspired by the discovery and started exploring the Canadian Rockies which led to his discovery of the Burgess Shale, a fossil-bearing deposit that was later determined to be of Cambrian in age (about 505 million years old). Between 1910 and 1924, Walcott discovered many fossils belonging to different groups (phyla) of animals, the rich diversity of which gave rise to the expression "Cambrian explosion" as an explanation of the emergence of so many animals (about 70,000 specimens had been collected) within a short geological time.

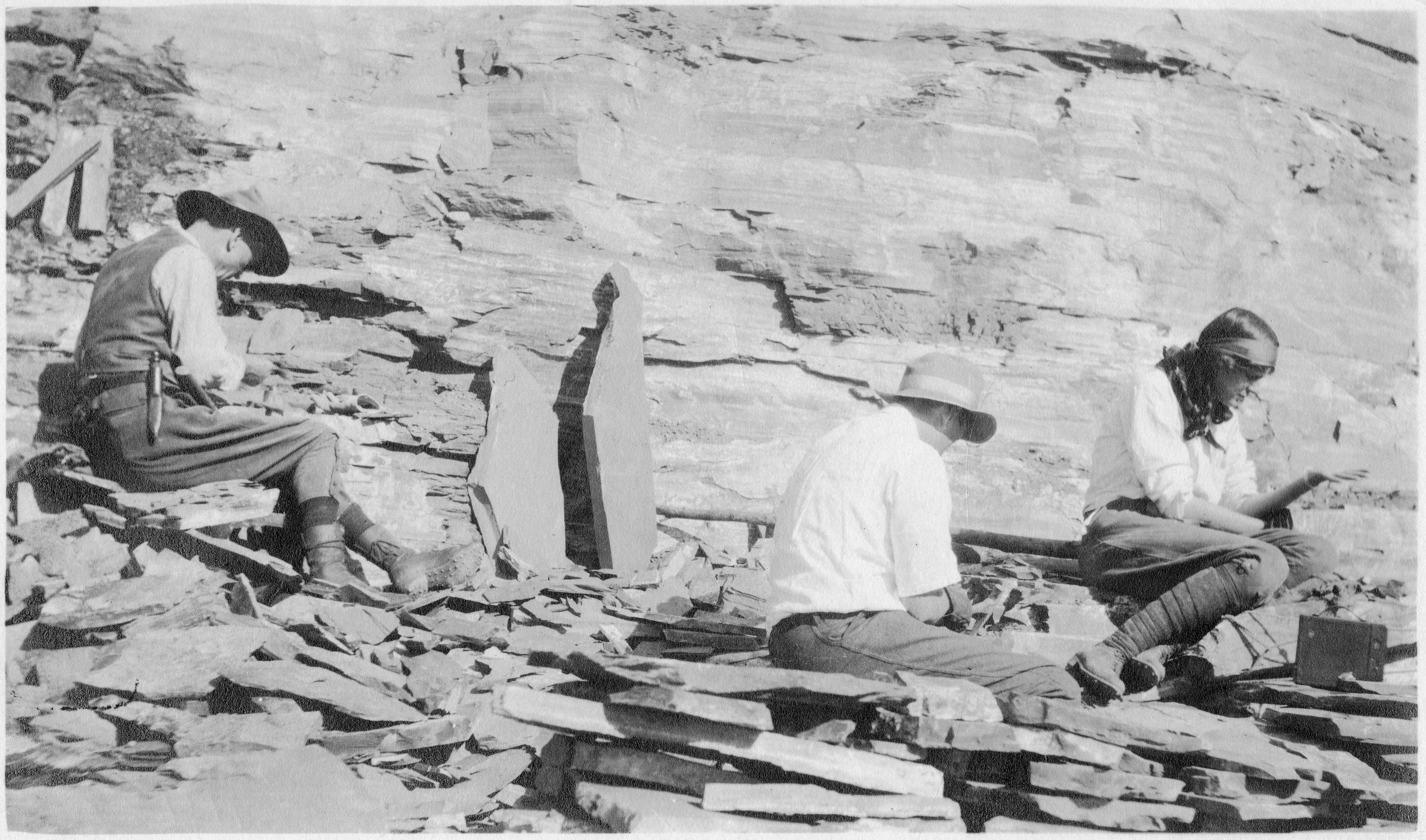
Charles Doolittle Walcott (1850-1927), with his children, Sidney (1892-1977) in the middle and Helen (1894-1965) on the right.

Burgess Shale animals were so abundant and diverse that Walcott could not identify important specimens and made big mistakes on many species. For examples, he described a jellyfish which he called Peytoia and a large sea cucumber-like body that he called Laggania. He also discovered a lancelet-like animal called Pikaia, which he believed to be a polychaete worm but refrained from making a conclusion. Two species he identified as polychaete worms were named Canadia sparsa and Canadia spinosa, believing them to be related. All these identifications and interpretations were later found to be erroneous.

=== Stephen Jay Gould and contingency ===
Harvard University palaeontologist, Stephen Jay Gould, was the first to effectively explain evolutionary contingency and popularised the phenomenon of Cambrian explosion. in his presidential address of the Paleontological Society on 27 October 1988, he cited Pikaia to explain the trends of evolutionary changes:

Wind back life's tape to the Burgess (first erasing what actually came after), let it play again, and this time a quite different cast may emerge. If the cast lacked Pikaia, the first chordate, we might not be here—and the world would be no worse... Let us thank our lucky stars for the survival of Pikaia.

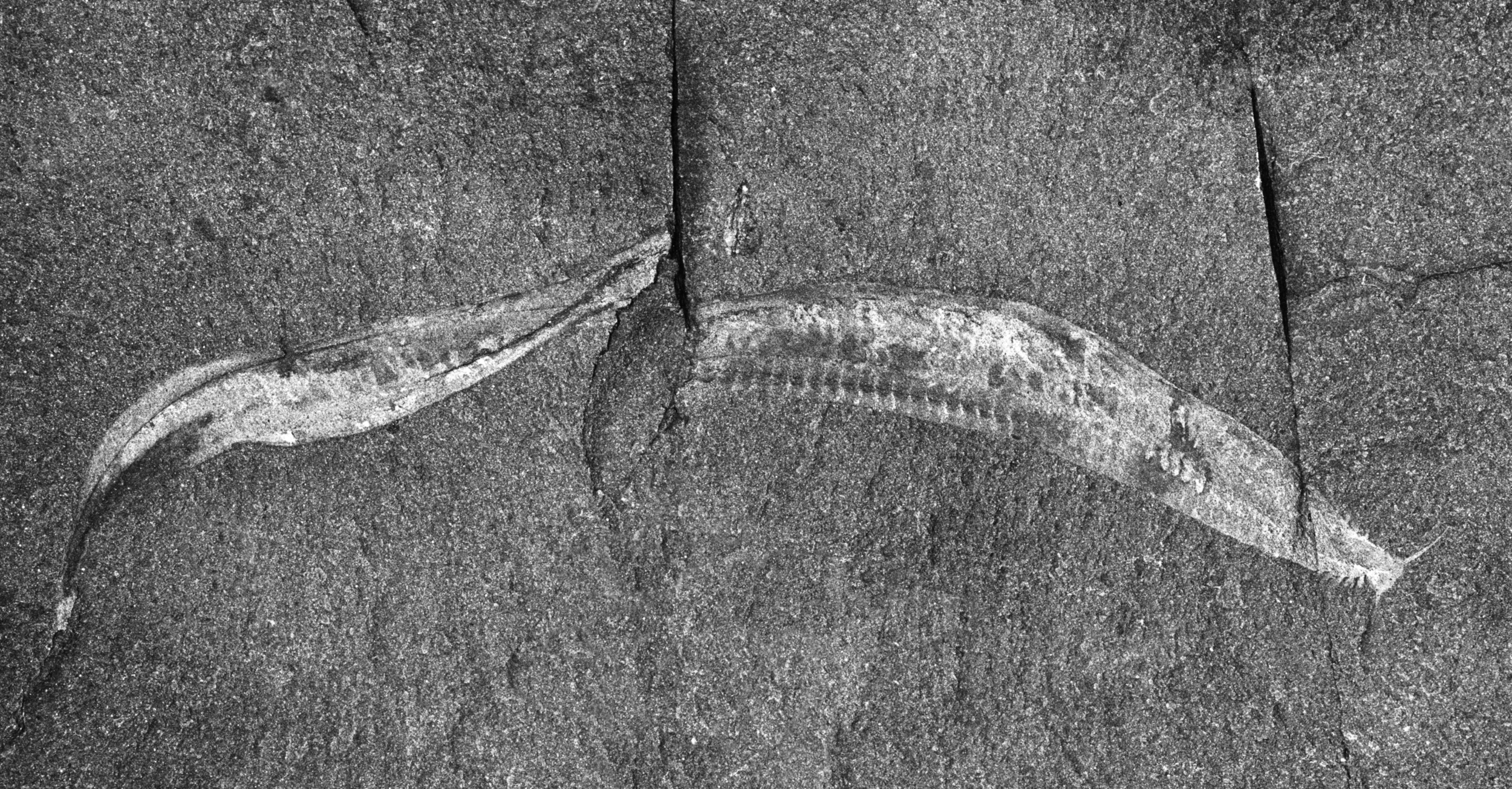
Pikaia fossil

He elaborated the same idea in "An epilogue on Pikaia" in his book Wonderful Life "to save the best for the last," in which he made a statement:

Pikaia is the missing and final link in our story of contingency—the direct connection between Burgess decimation and eventual human evolution... Wind the tape of life back to Burgess times, and let it play again. If Pikaia does not survive in the replay, we are wiped out of future history—all of us, from shark to robin to orangutan... And so, if you wish to ask the question of the age—why do humans exist?—a major part of the answer, touching those aspects of the issue that science can treat at all, must be: because Pikaia survived the Burgess decimation.

The book and its scientific message became hugely influential, and according to Michael Ruse, a philosopher of science at Florida State University, it "was the best book written by the late Stephen Jay Gould" that made Cambrian explosion into public interest. Gould, from this statement, is regarded as "the most famous proponent" of evolutionary contingency. His interpretation of Cambrian life as chances of evolutionary products that are unpredictable became an influential scientific philosophy. His idea has inspired many research involving evolutionary contingency in different branches of biology. According to him, contingency is a major factor that drives large-scale evolution (macroevolution) and dictates that evolution has no inevitable destiny or outcome. However, as Gould explained, "The bad news is that we can't possibly perform the experiment."

== Summary ==
The Crucible of Creation narrates the discoveries of Cambrian animals largely focussing on the works of Walcott. It starts with the emergence of animals on this Earth and how Cambrian life was preceded by Pre-Cambrian organisms, called the Ediacaran biota. After the simple Pre-Cambrian life forms suddenly appeared complex and distinct animals in the Cambrian world. The evidence of this cambrian radiation is unarguably given by the Burgess Shale fauna. As explorations on Cambrian fossils expanded around the world, the Burgess Shale fauna is not restricted to the Canadian region, but similar and unique Cambrian fossils were discovered in Greenland and China. As they are later and more appropriately called Burgess Shale-type fauna, the variety of animals representing major phyla of animals that exist today, including those that cannot be assigned to any known phyla, truly is an evolutionary phenomenon, the reality of Cambrian explosion. The book's main message is the implications of Cambrian fauna, how we can understand the origin of animals and how we, humans, are the pinnacle of evolution from the Cambrian world.

The book deals in great details on the revisions of Walcott's identification of species. In 1966, the Geological Survey of Canada began a comprehensive revision of the Burgess Shale fossil record, led by Harry B. Whittington from the University of Cambridge. Whittington was joined by his PhD students Conway Morris and Derek Briggs. An early task of Conway Morris was to examine Laggania and Peytoia, and soon realised that the two were related. When Briggs compared them with Anomalocaris, it became obvious that the three fossils were of the same animal, representing fragments of body part, and the whole animal would be later recognised as the largest Cambrian animal.

Conway Morris discovered that Pikaia was not related to polychaete worms, but instead appeared to be a primitive chordate (the phylum of which includes humans). On careful examination, he and Whittington eventually proved that it was indeed a chordate. Conway Morris also found that Walcott's Canadia sparsa was not a polychaete worm, and not related to Canadia spinosa, identifying it as a distinct animal and named it Hallucigenia, now classified under a phylum of extinct animals, Lobopodia.

== Reception ==
Mark Ridley of the University of Oxford, in The New York Times review, admired the rich fossils of Burgess Shale and how Conway Morris helped to solved many of their mysteries. He wrote: "Simon Conway Morris likes to picture the Burgess animals in their natural setting, rather than as dusty rocks on the museum bench, and he does a good job of bringing them to life in "The Crucible of Creation". His job is made possible, if not easy, by the extraordinary preservation of the [70,000] fossils... even dinosaur lovers will indulge Conway Morris's remark that the Burgess Shale is "the most wonderful fossil deposit in the world." Jeffrey Levinton at the State University of New York commented in The Quarterly Review of Biology: "Conway Morris's book characterizes these (Cambrian research) developments very well. The Cambrian explosion is once again becoming part of the commons, and that is all for the good. It may be the twilight of the gods."

Peter J. Bowler at the Queen's University Belfast described the book in American Scientist as "an assault on Gould's Burgess Shale interpretation. Steve Leslie at the University of Arkansas was critical of many of Conway Morris' interpretations of fossils, and particularly on the impression of the book that it was largely built upon Gould's Wonderful Life. He remarked in Palaeontologia Electronica: "Unfortunately, this theme is articulated in a way that gives the reader the idea that Conway Morris' dispute with Gould is as personal as it is intellectual. Conway Morris' zeal in this matter [discussing from the Preface through the last footnote in the last chapter] is the books main detraction, and serves to distract the reader from his truly interesting ideas." Nigel C. Hughes at the University of California also concurred on the undue attack on Gould, as he wrote in Paleobiology: "[Conway Morris'] conviction that Gould is wrong goes beyond science, and the most remarkable aspect of the book is the extent to which it deals with perceived ethical implications of various interpretations of the Burgess Shale... Many [readers] will feel rising sympathy [as they read on] for Gould... merely because Conway Morris is so relentless."

Andrew Berry of Harvard University explained the nature of the book in Evolution as "biting the hand that feeds," alluding to Gould's Wonderful Life as the primary populariser of Cambrian research. Geoffrey Fryer of Lancaster University gave the most elaborate review of the book in Hydrobiologia and criticised it for many instances of misrepresentation of the scientific information including classification of the species and their evolutionary relationship. For example, Conway Morris was convinced that Anamomalocaris (and related anomalocarids) were ambiguously ancestral to arthropods, to which Fryer remarked, "We do not know the evolutionary history of the anomalocaridids, and their place in the scheme of things is uncertain. If only for convenience they can at least be recognised as a distinctive group whose status is incertae sedis [uncertain taxonomic position]."

== Debate on evolutionary contingency ==
The primary goal of The Crucible of Creation is to argue against evolutionary contingency. Opposing Gould, Conway Morris believed that evolution has a purpose and that regardless of how many times evolutionary steps were repeated in the past, modern species are destined to be the final products including humans and intelligence. This implies that evolutionary end products are predictable. Instead, he advocated the alternative evolutionary pathway, convergence, by which biological properties evolving through time would ultimately form characteristic patterns that are seen in living species. As he explained in the introduction:

Gould's view is unequivocal. The likelihood of Man evolving on any other planet is extraordinarily unlikely. To paraphrase: if the history of evolution were to be repeated, the world would teem with myriad forms of life (note that the contingent likelihood of the origin of life itself goes through on the nod), but certainly no humans... What we are interested in is not the origin, destiny, or fate of a particular lineage, but the likelihood of the emergence of a particular property, say consciousness. Here the reality of convergence suggests that the tape of life, to use Gould's metaphor, can be run as many times as we like and in principle intelligence will surely emerge. On our planet we see it in molluscs (octopus) and mammals (Man).

Criticising Gould's example of Pikaia as a defining evolutionary contingency, a critical step in the evolution of chordates that led to the formation of humans, he wrote:

[We] muddy the waters of the debate if we fail to acknowledge that the processes of evolution have metaphysical implications for us. This is because uniquely there is inherent in our human situation the possibility of transcendence. The fact that we arrived here via an immensely long string of species that originated in something like Pikaia rather than some other crepuscular blob is a wonderful scientific story.

To Gould's explanation of the possibilities of alternative evolutions during Cambrian, he made an argument:

The reason for discussing convergence here is that its recognition effectively undermines the main plank of Gould’s argument on the role of contingent processes in shaping the tree of life and thereby determining the outcome at any one time. Put simply, contingency is inevitable, but unremarkable. It need not provoke discussion, because it matters not. There are not an unlimited number of ways of doing something. For all its exuberance, the forms of life are restricted and channelled.

The book devotes the last chapter refuting the core information in Wonderful Life as "perhaps exaggerated, and that some of them may be either incorrect or simply uninteresting." It makes the conclusion:

Although there may be a billion potential pathways for evolution to follow from the Cambrian explosion, in fact the real range of possibilities and hence the expected end results appear to be much more restricted... Convergence demonstrates that the possible types of organisms are not only limited, but may in fact be severely constrained. The underlying reason for convergence seems to be that all organisms are under constant scrutiny of natural selection and are also subject to the constraints of the physical and chemical factors that severely limit the action of all inhabitants of the biosphere. Put simply, convergence shows that in a real world not all things are possible.

Ridley remarked that Conway Morris failed to make a convincing message, saying: "He disagrees with Gould about almost everything – or he seems to. As writing, these are the least successful parts of the book," and that book's objection to evolutionary contingency "shies away from spelling the argument out." Bowler pointed out a problem in Conway Morris' examplification of marsupials and placental mammals as a case of convergence claiming that if convergence is more powerful than contingency, we would expect kangkaroos or their like marsupials in different parts of the world, not just in Australia. He concluded that the argument that "the outcome of evolution is predetermined" is unconvincing. Mike Foote of the University of Chicago also doubted the example of whales, saying: "the evolution of whales and their analogues may be more contingent that Conway Morris suggests," as fossil record show very limited diversity and a slow adaptive change in the ancestral mammals.
