= Fossils of the Burgess Shale =

Mid-Cambrian fossils from a deposit in British Columbia, Canada

The fossils of the Burgess Shale, like the Burgess Shale itself, are fossils that formed around 505 million years ago in the mid-Cambrian period. They were discovered in Canada in 1886, and Charles Doolittle Walcott collected over 65,000 specimens in a series of field trips up to the alpine site from 1909 to 1924. After a period of neglect from the 1930s to the early 1960s, new excavations and re-examinations of Walcott's collection continue to reveal new species, and statistical analysis suggests that additional discoveries will continue for the foreseeable future. Stephen Jay Gould's 1989 book Wonderful Life describes the history of discovery up to the early 1980s, although his analysis of the implications for evolution has been contested.

The fossil beds are in a series of shale layers, averaging 30 millimetres (1.2 in) and totalling about 160 metres (520 ft) in thickness. These layers were deposited against the face of a high undersea limestone cliff. All these features were later raised up 2,500 metres (8,000 ft) above current sea level during the creation of the Rocky Mountains.

These fossils have been preserved in a distinctive style known as Burgess Shale-type preservation, which preserves fairly tough tissues such as cuticle as thin films, and soft tissues as solid shapes, quickly enough that decay has not destroyed them. Moderately soft tissues, such as muscles, are lost. Scientists are still unsure about the processes that created these fossils. While there is little doubt that the animals were buried under catastrophic flows of sediment, it is uncertain whether they were transported by the flows from other locations, or lived in the area where they were buried, or were a mixture of local and transported specimens. This issue is closely related to whether conditions around the burial sites were anoxic or had a moderate supply of oxygen. Anoxic conditions are generally thought the most favourable for fossilization, but imply that the animals could not have lived where they were buried.

In the 1970s and early 1980s the Burgess fossils were largely regarded as evidence that the familiar phyla of animals appeared very rapidly in the Early Cambrian, in what is often called the Cambrian explosion. This view was already known to Charles Darwin, who regarded it as one of the greatest difficulties for the theory of evolution he presented in The Origin of Species in 1859. However, from the early 1980s the cladistics method of analysing "evolutionary family trees" has persuaded most researchers that many of the Burgess Shale's "weird wonders", such as Opabinia and Hallucigenia, were evolutionary "aunts and cousins" of present-day types of animal rather than a rapid proliferation of separate phyla, some of which were short-lived. Nevertheless, there is still debate, sometimes vigorous, about the relationships between some groups of animals.

== Discovery, collection, and re-examinations ==
The first Burgess Shale fossils were found on Mount Stephen in Canada's Rocky Mountains by a construction worker, whose reports of them reached Richard McConnell of the Geological Survey of Canada. McConnell found trilobite beds there in 1886, and some unusual fossils that he reported to his superior. These were misdiagnosed as headless shrimps with unjointed appendages, and were named Anomalocaris because of their unusual appendages – but turned out to be pieces of a puzzle that took 90 years to solve.

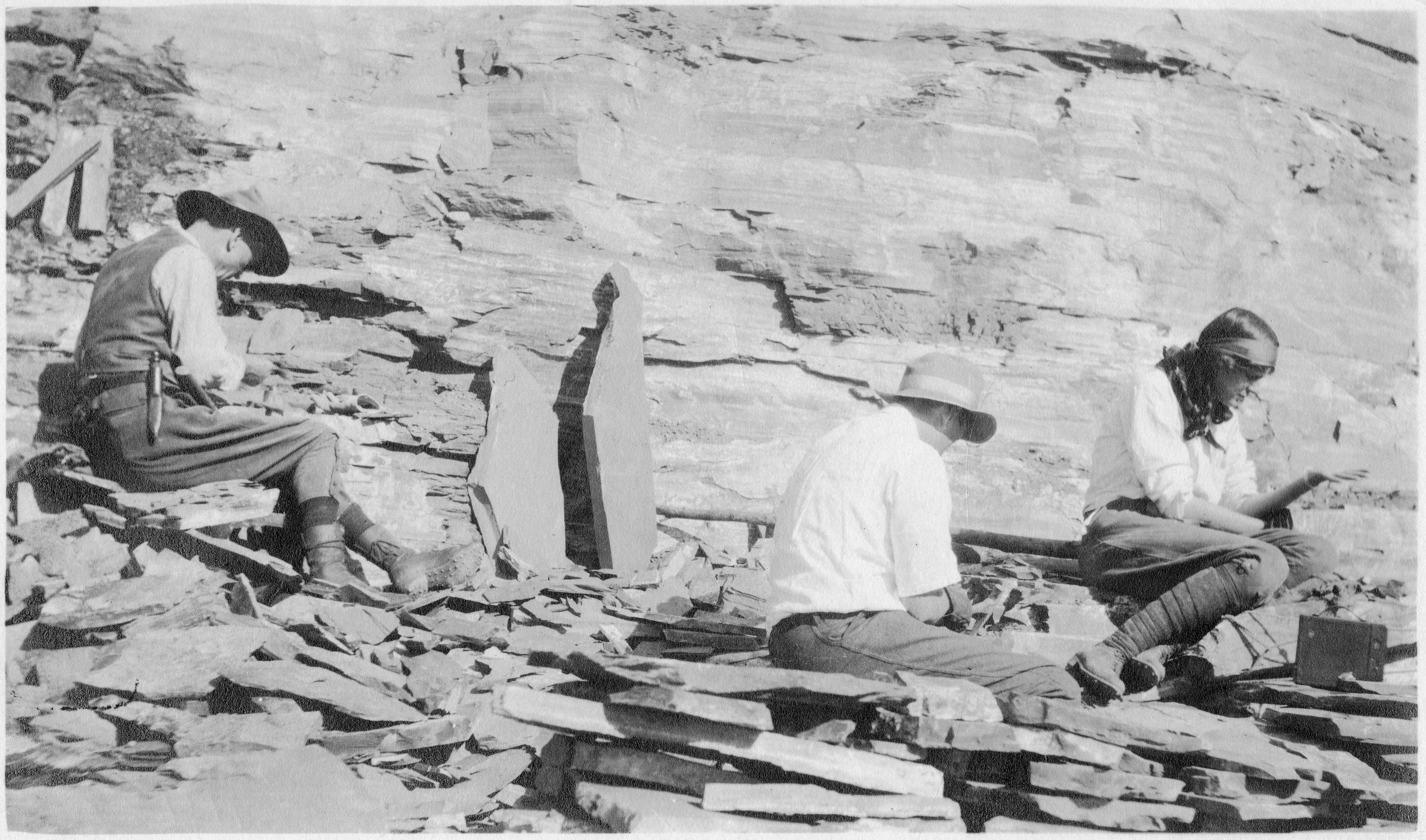
Charles Walcott searches the Burgess Shale for fossils, assisted by his wife and son, c. 1913

Similar fossils were reported in 1902 from nearby Mount Field, another part of the Stephen Formation. These may have been why Charles Doolittle Walcott visited Mount Field in 1909. While taking photographs there Walcott found a slab of fossils that he described as "Phyllopod crustaceans". From late August to early September 1909, his team, including his family, collected fossils there, and in 1910 Walcott opened a quarry that he and his colleagues re-visited in 1911, 1912, 1913, 1917 and 1924, bringing back over 60,000 specimens in total. Walcott was Secretary of the Smithsonian Institution from 1907 to his death in 1927, and this kept him so busy that he was still trying to make time for analyzing his finds two years before his death. Although he drew attention to the exceptional detail of the specimens, which were the first known fossils of soft-bodied animals from the Cambrian period, he also had other research interests: the Early Paleozoic stratigraphy of the Canadian Rockies, which took up the great majority of his time there; and Precambrian fossils of algae and bacteria, to which he assigned as much importance as to the fossils of animals. He managed to publish four "preliminary" papers on the fossil animals in 1911 and 1912, and further articles in 1918, 1919 and 1920. Four years after Walcott's death his associate Charles Resser produced a package of additional descriptions from Walcott's notes. Walcott's classifications of most of the fossils are now rejected, but were supported at the time, and he accepted a change for one of the few where his conclusion was disputed. Many of the later comments were made with the benefits of hindsight, and of techniques and concepts unknown in Walcott's time.

Although in 1931 Percy Raymond opened and briefly excavated another quarry about 20 metres (66 ft) above Walcott's "Phyllopod bed", there was very little interest in the Burgess Shale fossils from the 1930s to the early 1960s, and most of those collected by Walcott were stored on high shelving in back rooms at the Smithsonian Institution. Between 1962 and the mid-1970s Alberto Simonetta re-examined some of Walcott's collection and suggested some new interpretations. Beginning in the early 1970s Harry Whittington, his associates David Bruton and Christopher Hughes, and his graduate students Derek Briggs and Simon Conway Morris began a thorough re-examination of Walcott's collection. Although they assigned groups of fossils to each member of the team, they all decided for themselves which fossils to investigate and in what order. Their publications and Stephen Jay Goulds' popularization of their work in his book Wonderful Life aroused enduring scientific interest and some public interest in the Cambrian explosion, the apparently rapid appearance of moderately complex bilaterian animals in the Early Cambrian.

The continuing search for Burgess Shale fossils since the mid-1970s has led to the description in the 1980s of an arthropod Sanctacaris and in 2007 of Orthrozanclus, which looked like a slug with a small shell at the front, chain mail over the back and long, curved spines round the edges. Recent digs have discovered species yet to be formally described and named. They have also unearthed more and sometimes better fossils of animals that were discovered earlier, for example Odontogriphus was for many years known from just one poorly preserved specimen, but the discovery of a further 189 formed the basis for a detailed description and analysis in 2006. Re-examination of Walcott's collection also continues, and has led to the reconstruction of the large marine animal Hurdia in 2009.

== Geology ==
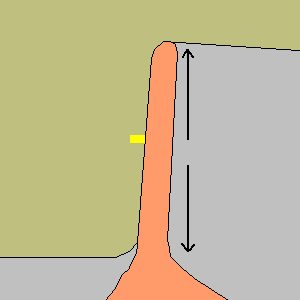
Geology of the Burgess Shale (cross-section, looking north)

Shale Limestone dolomite

Walcott's "Phyllopod bed"

The Burgess Shale is a series of sediment deposits spread over a vertical distance of hundreds of metres, extending laterally for at least 50 kilometres (30 mi). The deposits were originally laid down on the floor of a shallow sea; during the Late Cretaceous Laramide orogeny, mountain-building processes squeezed the sediments upwards to their current position at around 2,500 metres (8,000 ft) elevation in the Rocky Mountains.

The rocks containing the fossils are on the border between two partially overlapping bands of rock that run along the western face of the Canadian Rockies. On the eastern side of this border is the Cathedral Formation, a platform of limestone formed by algae. The western surface of the Cathedral Formation is steep and consists of the resistant rock dolomite, which was originally part of the limestone platform, but between the Mid Silurian and Late Devonian was transformed by hydrothermal flows of brine at up to 200 °C (400 °F), which replaced much of the limestone's calcium with magnesium. A layer of shale lies partly on top of and partly to the west of the Cathedral Formation. This shale layer used to be called the "thin" Stephen Formation where it lies above the Cathedral Formation and the "thick" Stephen Formation where it lies to the west; but the "thick" Stephen Formation is now generally known as the Burgess Formation.

The shale is made of alternating fine-grained layers of siliceous mudstone (compressed, hardened mud originally made of ground-up silicate rock) and calcisiltite originally animal shells. The calcisiltite layers contain relatively unremarkable shells and occasional non-biomineralized fossils (such as priapulid tubes). The soft-bodied organisms for which the Burgess Shale is famous are fossilized in the mudstone layers, which are between 2 and 170 millimetres (0.079 and 6.693 in) thick, averaging 30 millimetres (1.2 in), and have well-defined bases. Opinions vary about how the mudstone layers were produced: perhaps by mudslides from the top of the "Cathedral" limestone platform, when its edge collapsed occasionally; or possibly by storms that created back-currents that abruptly washed large volumes of mud off the platform. Each mudstone layer is the result of one such catastrophe. The Greater Phyllopod Bed, a 7 metres (23 ft) thick sequence consisting of Walcott's famous "Phyllopod Bed" plus the 5 metres (16 ft) below that, contains at least 36 layers, deposited over 10 to 100 thousand years, during which the environment was essentially stable.

== Fossil preservation ==
The processes responsible for preserving the exceptional quality of the Burgess Shale fossils are unclear, due partly to two related issues: whether the animals were buried where they lived (or may have been carried long distances by sediment flows), or whether the water at the burial sites was anoxic, limiting the effect of oxygen on degradation. The traditional view is that soft bodies and organs could only be preserved in anoxic conditions, otherwise oxygen-breathing bacteria would have made decomposition too rapid for fossilization. This would imply that the sea-floor organisms could not have lived there. However, in 2006 Caron and Jackson concluded that the sea-floor animals were buried where they lived. One of their main reasons was that many fossils represented partially decayed soft-bodied animals such as polychaetes, which had already died shortly before the burial event, and would have been fragmented if they had been transported any significant distance by a storm of swirling sediment. Other evidence for burial where the animals had lived includes the presence of tubes and burrows, and of assemblies of animals preserved while they fed – such as a group of carnivorous priapulids clustered round a freshly moulted arthropod whose new cuticle would not yet have hardened. Fossilized swimming organisms were also buried immediately below where they lived.

Fossil tracks are rare and no burrows under the sea-floor have so far been found in the Burgess Shale. These absences have been used to support the idea that the water near the sea-floor was anoxic. However it is possible that the water just above the sea-floor was oxygenated while the water in the sediment below it was anoxic, and also possible that there simply were no deep-burrowing animals in the Burgess Shale. Some fossils, such as Marrella, are almost always the right way up, which suggests they were not transported far if at all. Others, such as Wiwaxia, are often at odd angles, and some fossils of animals with shelly or toughened components very rarely contain remains of soft tissues. This suggests that the distances over which corpses were transported may have varied between genera, although most were buried where they had lived.

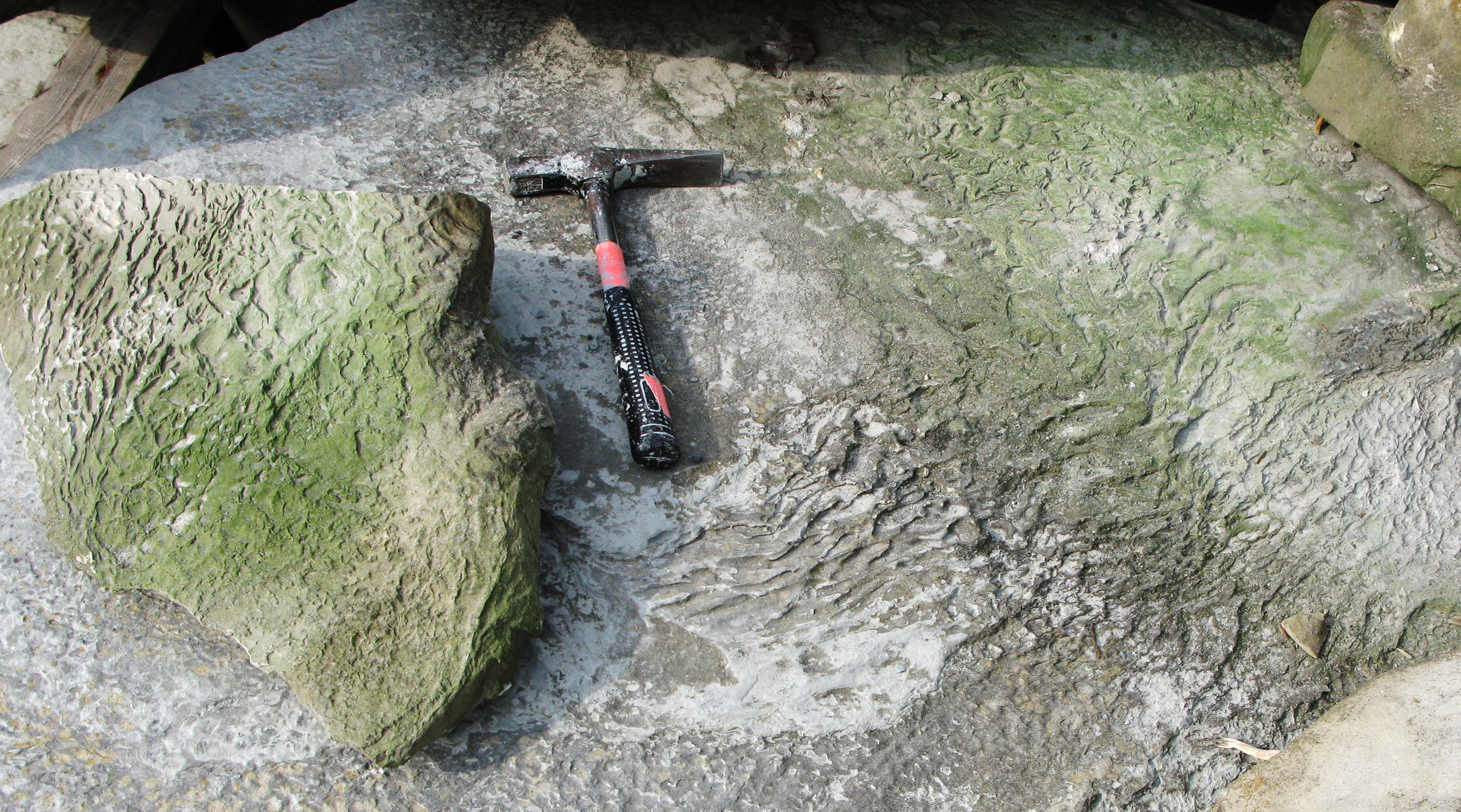
The typical wrinkled "elephant skin" texture of microbial mats

Fossils known as Girvanella and Morania may represent members of microbial mat communities. Morania appears on about a third of the slabs Caron and Jackson studied, and in some cases presents the wrinkled "elephant skin" texture typical of fossilized microbial mats. If such mats were present, they may have provided food for grazing animals and possibly helped to preserve soft bodies and organs, by creating oxygen-free zones under the mats and thus inhibiting the bacteria that cause decomposition.

The Burgess Shale animals were probably killed by changes in their environment either immediately preceding or during the mud-slides that buried them. Proposed killing mechanisms include: changes in salinity; poisoning by chemicals such as hydrogen sulfide or methane; changes in the availability of oxygen; and changing consistency of the sea floor. The death event was not necessarily related to the burial, and there may have been multiple death events between burial events; but only organisms killed immediately before a burial event would stand any chance of being fossilised, instead of rotting or being eaten.

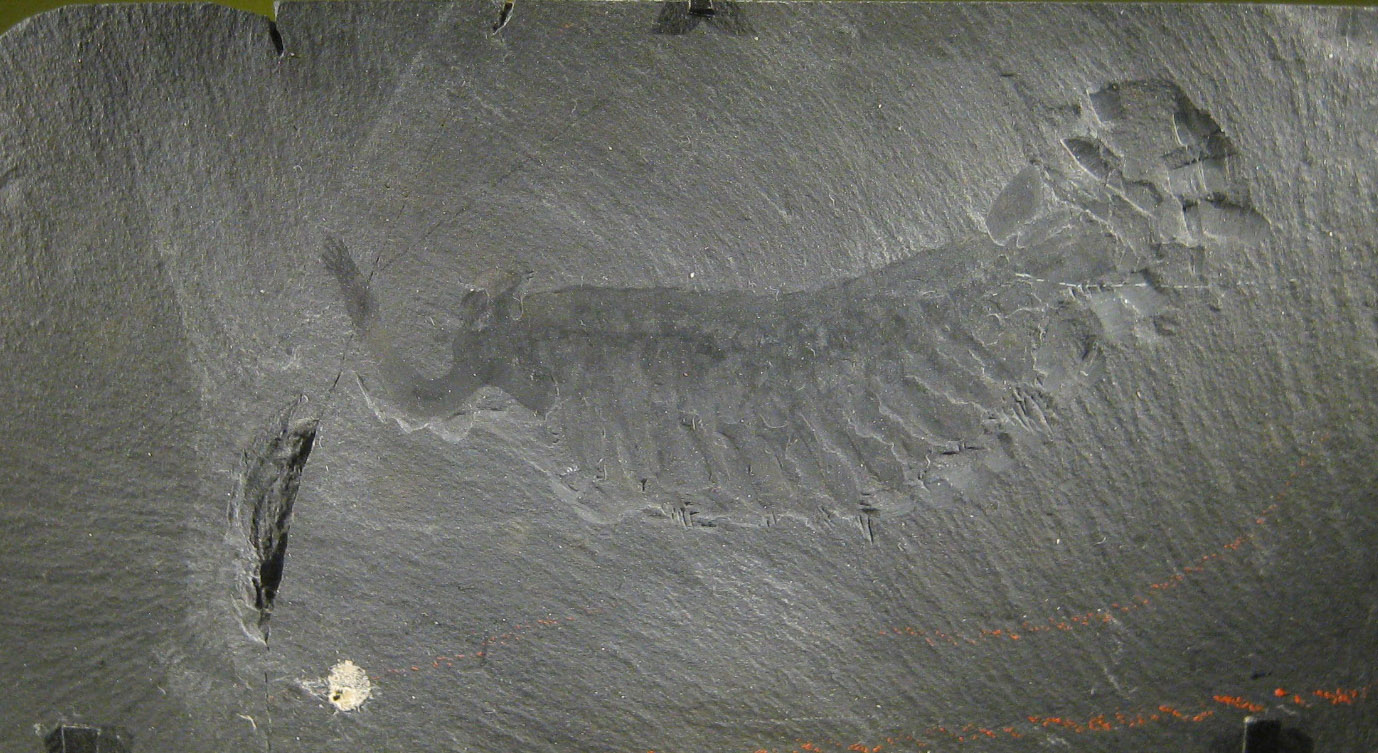
A typical flattened Burgess Shale fossil, Opabinia

Burgess shale type preservation is defined as the fossilization of non-biomineralized organisms as flattened carbonaceous films in marine shales. When the animals started to decompose, their tissues collapsed under the weight of the sediment that buried them. The typical flattened fossils are outlines of tougher parts such as cuticles and jaws, which resisted decomposition for long enough to be fossilized. Soft elements, such as muscles and gut contents, were sometimes squeezed out of the decomposing organism to produce dark stains on the fossils. Organisms that lack tougher structures, such as flatworms, nemerteans and shell-less molluscs, were not preserved by this process. Very soft but chemically active tissues may be preserved by different processes. For instance during decomposition, bacteria modify the chemically unusual mid-gut glands of some organisms into the durable mineral phosphate. This change happens extremely quickly, before the corpse is compressed, and leaves a three-dimensional mold of the tissues. Gills can also be preserved in something close to their original three-dimensional shape by this process. Both preservation mechanisms can appear in the same fossil. In Burgess-like shales, organisms and parts that are only quite soft, such as muscles, are generally lost, while those that are extremely soft and those that are fairly tough are preserved. The preservation of different body parts in different ways may sometimes help palaeontologists, by suggesting whether a body part was fairly tough like an arthropod limb (preserved as flat film) or very soft and chemically active, like a part of the gut (preserved as a solid piece of mineral). These differences may also help to identify fossils, by excluding from consideration organisms whose body parts do not match the combination of types of preservation found in a particular fossil bed.

It has often been suggested that this type of preservation was possible only when sediments were not disturbed by burrowing animals or the anchors of plants. However a similar type of preservation has been found in fossils from the Late Riphean period, about 850 to 750 million years ago, but in no known fossils between the end of that epoch and the start of the Cambrian. This suggests that such bioturbation has little to do with the appearance and disappearance of Burgess Shale type preservation. Such preservation may depend on the presence of clay-like minerals that inhibit decomposition, and ocean chemistry may only have favoured the production of such minerals for limited periods of time. If so, it is impossible to be sure when the animals known as "Burgess Shale fauna" first appeared or when they became extinct. A few fossils of animals similar to those found in the Burgess Shale have been found in rocks from the Silurian, Ordovician and Early Devonian periods, in other words up to 100 million years after the Burgess Shale.

== Faunal composition ==
As of 2008only two in-depth studies of the mix of fossils in any part of the Burgess Shale had been published, by Simon Conway Morris in 1986 and by Caron and Jackson in 2008. Caron and Jackson commented that Conway Morris had to rely on a set of specimens that may not have been representative, since their excavators discarded specimens they found uninteresting; and for which the exact level in the rock sequence had not been recorded, making chronological analyses impossible. Both studies noted that the set of species in Walcott's Phyllopod Bed (Conway Morris, 1986) and its expanded version the Greater Phyllopod Bed (Caron and Jackson, 2008) was different from those found in other parts of the Burgess Shale; and Conway Morris commented that faunas at most other Burgess Shale sites resembled those of the Raymond Quarry, which is above and therefore more recent than the Greater Phyllopod Bed (abbreviated "GPB").

Conway Morris found that the shelly fossils in Walcott's Phyllopod Bed were about as abundant as in other shelly fossil deposits, but accounted for only 14% of the Phyllopod Bed fossils. Assuming that, as in modern marine ecosystems, about 70% of the species that lived in the Early Cambrian seas are unsuitable for fossilization, he estimated that the shelly fossils probably represent about 2% of the animals that were alive at the time. Since these shelly fossils are found in other parts of North America and, in many cases, over a much wider range, the Burgess Shale fossils, including the soft-bodied ones, probably show how much diversity could be expected at other sites if Burgess Shale type preservation were found there.

Caron and Jackson found that about 25% of the 172 known species were abundant and widespread throughout the time range of the GPB, while the majority of species were rare, and occurred in a small area for a short period of time. In most layers the five most abundant species accounted for 50% to 75% of individual animals. The species that had wide ranges in time and space may have been generalists, while the rest were specialists in particular types of environment. Alternatively some wide-ranging species may have been opportunists that were quick to recolonize the area after each burial event. The 6 species that appeared in all layers were very probably generalists.

In each burial event layer the commonest species generally has several times as many individuals as the second most common, and accounts for 15% to 30% of individual fossil animals. The more common a species is in one layer, the greater the number of other layers it appears in. These "recurrent" species account for 88% of the individual specimens, but only 27% of the number of species. This suggests that the majority of species were in existence for much shorter periods than the "recurrent" ones. Species that cover shorter periods of time occur mainly in the higher, younger layers. The GPB shows an overall trend of increasing diversity as time progresses.

In almost all layers arthropods are the most abundant and diverse group of fossils in the GPB, followed by sponges. 69.2% of GPB individuals and 63.9% of species lived on the surface of the sea bed; within this group, mobile deposit feeders that extracted food particles from the sediment accounted for 38.2% of the total number of individuals and 16.8% of the total species; the smallest sub-group was mobile hunters and scavengers; and the rest were sessile suspension feeders. Animals that lived in the sediment made up 12.7% of the species and 7.4% of the individuals; the largest sub-group was mobile hunters and scavengers. Bottom-dwelling animals capable of swimming comprised 12.7% of species and 7.4% of individuals. Organisms that spent their whole life swimming were very rare, accounting for only 1.5% of individuals and 8.3% of species.

These patterns – a few common species and many rare ones; the dominance of arthropods and sponges; and the percentage frequencies of different life-styles – seem to apply to all of the Burgess Shale. However the identity of the dominant species differs between sites. For example, Marrella splendens is often credited as the commonest animal in the Burgess Shale, because of its abundance among the specimens collected by Walcott, but is only the third-most abundant organism in the Greater Phyllopod Bed, and very rare at other localities.

The overall community and ecology is very similar to that of other Cambrian localities, suggesting a global pool of species that repopulated localities after calamitous burial events occurred.

Caron and Jackson used computer software to simulate the numbers of species that would be found if smaller numbers of specimens were included, and found that the number of species "discovered" kept increasing as the number of specimens increased, rather than reaching a plateau. This suggests that Burgess Shale probably still contains as-yet undiscovered species, although probably very rare ones. Some recently discovered species, known in 2008 only by nicknames like "woolly bear" and "Siamese lantern" are familiar to the collecting teams, but have yet to be formally described and named. The team also nicknamed another discovery as "Creeposaurus", and in 2010 this animal was described and formally named Herpetogaster.

== Biota ==
=== Soft-bodied fossils ===
The survey by Caron and Jackson covered 172 species found in the Greater Phyllopod Bed. The list below concentrates on discoveries in the late 20th century, and on species central to major scientific debates.

Marrella was the first Burgess Shale fossil that Whittington re-examined, and gave the first indication that surprises were on the way. Although clearly an arthropod that walked on the sea-floor, Marella was very different from the known marine arthropod groups (trilobites, crustaceans and chelicerates) in the structure of its legs and gills, and above all in the number and positions of the appendages on its head, which are the main feature used to classify arthropods. A fossil of Marrella from the Burgess Shale has also provided the earliest clear evidence of molting.

Whittington's first presentation about Opabinia made the audience laugh. The reconstruction showed a soft-bodied animal with a slim, segmented body; a pair of flap-like appendages on each segment with gills above the flaps; five stalked eyes; a backward-facing mouth under the head; and a long, flexible, hose-like proboscis that extended from under the front of the head and ended in a "claw" fringed with spines. Whittington concluded that it did not fit into any phylum known in the mid-1970s. Opabinia was one of the main reasons why Stephen Jay Gould in his book Wonderful Life considered that Early Cambrian life was much more diverse and "experimental" than any later set of animals, and that the Cambrian explosion was a truly dramatic event, possibly driven by unusual evolutionary mechanisms. He regarded Opabinia as so important to understanding this phenomenon that he originally wanted to call his book Homage to Opabinia. Subsequent research concluded that Opabinia was closely related to the arthropods, and possibly even closer to ancestors of the arthropods.

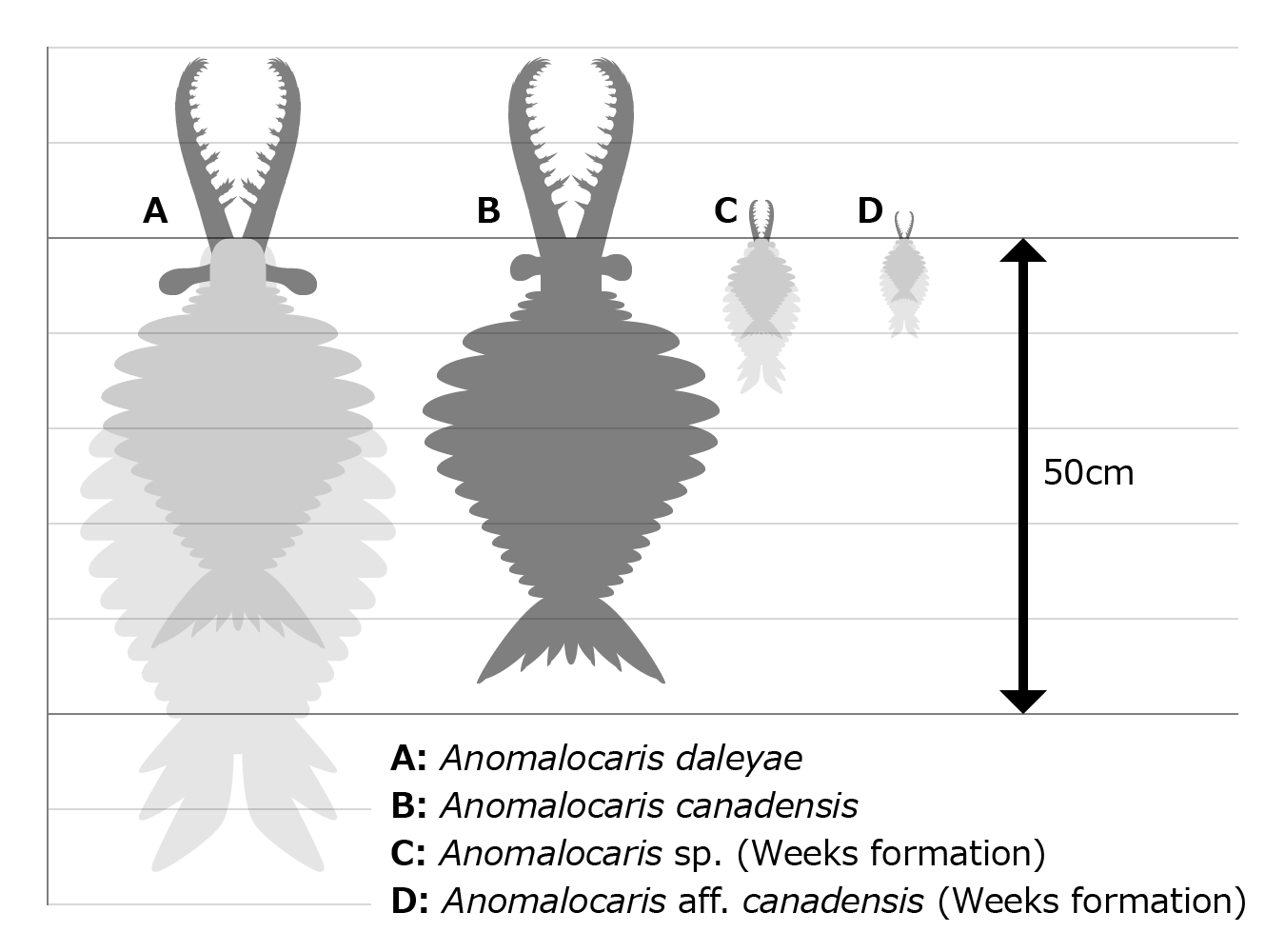
Size comparation of Anomalocaris canadensis (B)

The discovery of Anomalocaris ("abnormal shrimp") has been described as a comedy of errors. The name was initially given to a fossil that looked like the rear end of a shrimp-like crustacean. Walcott classified a ring-like fossil he called Peytoia as a kind of jellyfish, and another poorly preserved fossil he called Laggania as a holothurian (sea cucumber). After many plot twists, Derek Briggs started dissecting another ill-defined fossil in very thin slices and found a pair of Anomalocaris-like structures on one end of a specimen of Laggania, which also had a specimen of Peytoia attached just behind those of Anomalocaris. After dissecting more specimens and finding similar configurations, Briggs and Whittington concluded that the whole assemblage represented a single animal, which was named Anomalocaris because that was the earliest name assigned to any of its parts. This animal's body was fragile and usually disintegrated before it could be fossilized. But the complete animal had tough grasping appendages (Anomalocaris), a tough, ring-like mouth with teeth on the inner edge (Peytoia) and a long, segmented body (Laggania) with flaps on the sides that enabled it to swim with a Mexican wave motion, and perhaps to turn quickly by putting the flaps on one side into reverse. This monster was over 0.38 metres (1.2 ft) long without frontal appendages and tail fan, when other animals were only a few inches at most. Nedin suggested in 1999 that the animal was capable of taking heavily armored trilobites apart, possibly by grabbing one end of their prey in their jaws while using their appendages to quickly rock the other end of the animal back and forth, causing the prey's exoskeleton to rupture and allowing the predator to access its innards. In 2009 Hagadorn found that anomalocarid mouthparts showed little wear, which suggests they did not come into regular contact with mineralised trilobite shells. Computer modeling of the Anomalocaris mouthparts suggests they were in fact better suited to sucking on smaller, soft-bodied organisms. Although Whittington and Briggs concluded that Anomalocaris did not fit into any known phylum, research since the 1990s has concluded that it was closely related to Opabinia and to the ancestors of arthropods. In 2009 a fossil named Schinderhannes bartelsi, an apparent relative of Anomalocaris, was found in the Early Devonian period, about 100 million years later than the Burgess Shale. Conway Morris gave Hallucigenia its name because in his reconstruction it looked bizarre – a worm-like animal that walked on long, rigid spines and had a row of tentacles along its back. Science fiction author Greg Bear says the Jarts in his The Way stories were scaled-up versions of this reconstruction. However, in the late 1980s Lars Ramsköld literally turned it over, so that the tentacles, which he found were paired, became legs and the spines were defensive equipment on its back. Ramsköld classified it as one of the Onychophora, a phylum of "worms with legs" that is considered closely related to arthropods. Another view is that Hallucigenia was an armored lobopod more closely related to arthropods than onychophorans, but less closely related to arthropods than Opabinia or Anomalocaris.

Most fossils of Wiwaxia are disorganized armor plates and spines, but, after examining dozens of them, Conway Morris reconstructed them as slug-like animals covered in rows of overlapping armor plates, with two rows of longer spines projecting upwards. Since 1990, there has been an intense debate about whether Wiwaxia was more closely related to molluscs or to polychaete annelids. Supporters of a close relationship with molluscs maintained that a pair of bars, running across the mouth and armed with backward-pointing teeth, were a rudimentary form of the radula, the toothed tongue that molluscs use to scrape up food and convey it back to the throat. Nicholas Butterfield, the one academic who has so far published articles placing Wiwaxia closer to polychaetes, stated that Wiwaxia′s two-row feeding apparatus could not have performed the sophisticated functions of the multi-row, conveyor-belt radula, suggesting instead that Wiwaxia′s apparatus was like the side-by-side pair of toothed bars found in some polychaetes. Later he found some fragmentary fossils, 5 to 10 million years before the Burgess Shale, that he regarded as a much more convincing early radula. Butterfield has also described Wiwaxia′s armor plates and spines as similar in internal structure to the chetae ("hairs") of polychaetes. Supporters of the link with molluscs have stated that Wiwaxia shows no signs of segmentation, appendages in front of the mouth, or "legs—–all of which are typical polychaete features. One writer adopted a neutral position, saying he saw no strong grounds for classifying Wiwaxia as a proto-annelid or a proto-mollusc, although he thought the objections against classification as a proto-annelid were the stronger.

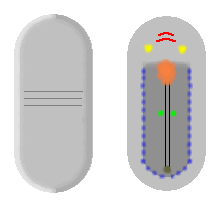
Odontogriphus – top at left, underside at right, with tooth-rows in red

For many years Odontogriphus ("toothed riddle") was known from only one specimen, an almost featureless oval smear on a slab, with hints of tiny conical teeth. However, 189 new finds in the years immediately preceding 2006 made a detailed description possible. It had a pair of slightly V-shaped tooth-rows just ahead of the mouth, very like Wiwaxia′s. This pitched Odontogriphus into the middle of the debate about whether Wiwaxia was closer to the mollusc or the annelid lineage, resulting in a frank exchange of views.

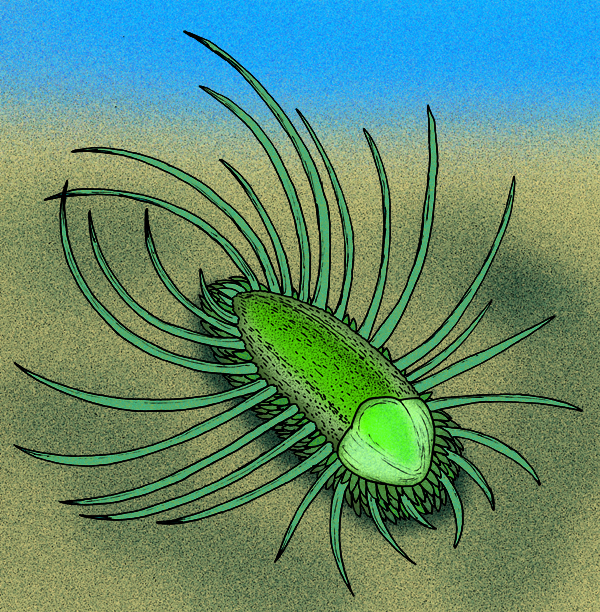
Artist's impression of Orthrozanclus

Orthrozanclus reburrus ("Dawn scythe with bristling hair") was discovered in 2006 and formally described in 2007. This animal had a soft, unarmored underside, but the upward-facing surfaces were armored by: a small shell, near the front end; three zones of armor plates, which fitted close to the body and one of which ran all the way round the animal; 16 to 20 long, upwards-curving spines on each side of the body. The arrangement of Orthrozanclus′ armor plates is very similar to that of its Burgess Shale contemporary Wiwaxia. Its shell is very similar to one of the two Burgess Shale shell types labelled Oikozetetes; the forward shell of halkieriids, most fossils of which are dated to the Early Cambrian; and those of other Early Cambrian fossils such as Ocruranus and Eohalobia. These similarities suggest that Orthrozanclus was an intermediate form between Wiwaxia and the Halkieriids and that all three of these taxa formed a clade, in other words a group that consists of a common ancestor and all of its descendants. So Orthrozanclus was also drawn into the complex debate about whether Wiwaxia is more closely related to molluscs or to polychaete worms.

For many years only one fossil Nectocaris was known, poorly preserved and without a counterpart. This fossil was a puzzle, as its head looked rather like that of an arthropod but its body, with what seemed to be fins along its back and belly, looked rather like of a chordate's. In 2010 Smith and Caron described another 91 specimens, some very good, and reconstructed it as a cephalopod, and the earliest one as of 2010. Unlike later cephalopods it had only two arms, and its eyes seem mounted on stalks. But it had a soft funnel, similar to the ones used for propulsion by modern cephalopods.

Canadia has always been classified as a polychaete worm. Recent microscopic examination has indicated that the surfaces of the many bristles on its "legs" were diffraction gratings that made the animal iridescent.

Fossils of chordates, the phylum to which humans belong, are very rare in Cambrian sediments. Conway Morris classified the Burgess Shale fossil Pikaia as a chordate because it had a rudimentary notochord, the rod of cartilage that evolved into the backbone of vertebrates. Doubts have been raised about this, because most of the important features are not quite like those of chordates: it has repeated blocks of muscle along its sides but they are not chevron-shaped; there is no clear evidence of anything like gills; and its throat appears to be in the upper part of its body rather than the lower. It also has "tentacles" on the front of its head, unlike living chordates. At best it may be a stem group chordate, in other words an evolutionary "aunt" of living chordates. Metaspriggina, also found in the Burgess Shale but even rarer, may be a chordate, if the repeated chevron-shaped structures along its sides represent muscle blocks. While Pikaia was celebrated in the mid-1970s as the earliest known chordate, three jawless fish have since been found among the Chengjiang fossils, which are about 17 million years older than the Burgess Shale.

=== Notable fossils ===
Note: the below table represents only a small fraction of the total number of species. A complete list can be found at Paleobiota of the Burgess Shale.

Notable Burgess Shale fossils
Genus	Phylum	Class	Abundance	Notes	Images
Aysheaia	Lobopodia	Xenusia		A lobopodian that possessed appendages for walking. Often found associated with sponges, it is possible that it fed on them.	
Hallucigenia	Lobopodia	Xenusia	Found in both the Burgess Shale and in China	An armoured lobopodian that was originally reconstructed upside-down. Material from China now shows that the original interpretation of "legs" are actually spines.	
Burgessochaeta	Annelida	Polychaeta	189 specimens	A bristle worm that used tentacles to feel for food. It had 24 segments, each carrying a pair of appendages used for propulsion. is thought to have been a decomposer or scavenger on organic material. It probably swam, as its bristles were too long to have been useful for moving itself in a burrow. Specimens have been found from both continental slope and deep-water environments, indicating that this was a widespread animal.	
Ottoia	Priapulida (?)	Archaeopriapulida	At least 1000 Burgess Shale specimens	A stem-group archaeopriapulid worm. Although priapulid-like worms from various Cambrian deposits are often referred to Ottoia on spurious grounds, the only clear macrofossils of this genus come from the Burgess Shale. Ottoia was a burrower that hunted prey with its eversible proboscis. It also appears to have scavenged on dead organisms such as the arthropod Sidneyia.	
Opabinia	Arthropoda	Dinocaridida		Opabinia is a strange Burgess Shale taxon; it had five stalked eyes and one appendage with a grasping claw. It may have both swum and walked along the sea floor. Opabinia looked so strange that the audience at the first presentation of its 1975 analysis laughed.	
Anomalocaris	Arthropoda	Dinocaridida		Resembling a headless shrimp, Anomalocaris was a large radiodont that got up to 50 centimetres (20 in) long. It was the apex predator of the Burgess Fauna, and trilobite remains preserve bite marks that may come from it. When described, only the lower jaws were known, and the mouth was named separately as the jellyfish Peytoia. Like its relatives, Anomalocaris possessed eye stalks.	
Marrella	Arthropoda	Marrellomorpha	over 15000 specimens	The most common organism of the Burgess Shale fauna. It was initially called the "Lace Crab" by Walcott, and was described more formally as an odd trilobite. In 1971, Whittington undertook a thorough redescription of the animal and, on the basis of its legs, gills and head appendages, concluded that it was neither a trilobite, nor a chelicerate, nor a crustacean. It carried a shield extending from its head over its gills. The brush-like appendages of its head probably swept food into its mouth. It is likely to have been an active swimmer with its swimming appendages used in a backstroke motion, with the large spines acting as stabilizers.	
Canadaspis	Arthropoda	Order Hymenocarina	4000 specimens from the Burgess Shale	A relative of modern-day shrimp, most Canadaspis specimens preserve only its distinctive carapace. Using its legs, Canadaspis brushed off mud to find food.	
Odaraia	Arthropoda	Order Hymenocarina	217 specimens	A hymenocarine arthropod that bore a large pair of eyes at the front of its body. It had a tubular body with at least 45 pairs of biramous limbs, and its tail had three fins.	
Waptia	Arthropoda	Order Hymenocarina		An arthropod that had an elongated body with the front covered by a bivalve carapace, with an elongate abdomen with a forked tail. Thought to have been an actively swimming predator of soft-bodied prey.	
Tuzoia	Arthropoda	Order Tuzoiida		A large bivalved arthropod known from Early to Middle Cambrian marine environments from what is now North America, Australia, China, Europe and Siberia. The large, domed carapace of the creature reached lengths of 180 millimetres (7.1 in), making it one of the largest known Cambrian arthropods.	
Burgessia	Arthropoda	Unassigned	1383 specimens	An arthropod of uncertain affinities. Burgessia had a delicate structure below its round carapace. The largest individuals were only a little over four centimetres in length, and the smallest about half a centimetre from the front of the carapace to the tip of the rear spine.	
Sanctacaris	Arthropoda	Chelicerata		Related to modern day horseshoe crabs, Sanctacaris was only first described in 1981. It possessed a large flat tail, suggesting it was a good swimmer, a group of six appendages in each side of its body, and a very streamlined head.	
Sidneyia	Arthropoda	Vicissicaudata		Sidneyia was a large 13 centimetres (5.1 in) long predator of the Burgess Shale, and ate trilobites, ostracods, and hyolithids. It was named after Walcott's second son, Sidney.	
Leanchoilia	Arthropoda	Megacheira		Leanchoilia is distinguished from other arthropods by its arms. They split into three appendages, probably to find food, as they lack the spiny characteristic of predators.	
Yohoia	Arthropoda	Megacheira		Yohoia was streamlined, and around 2000, it was compared to modern mantis shrimp. In had two four-fingered hands, and may have preyed on trilobites, smashing or spearing them with its fingers.	
Wiwaxia	Mollusca	Stem-group		Similar in appearance to a leaf-plated slug, Wiwaxia is a possible bristle worm, although its classification is controversial. Its diet likely constituted of organic detritus.	
Nectocaris	Gnathifera	stem-group Chaetognatha	A rare creature	Nectocaris superficially resembles a squid, and was long suggested to represent an early cephalopod, but is now thought to represent an early relative of arrow worms (chaetognaths) It was a predatory or scavenging organism, and was also probably a swimmer based on its streamlined body. It is rarely preserved, due to the nature of its anatomy. It had a flattened, kite-shaped body with a fleshy fin running along the length of each side. Although Nectocaris is known from Canada, China and Australia, in rocks spanning some 20 million years, there does not seem to be much diversity within the genus aside from size.	
Amiskwia	Gnathifera	stem-group Chaetognatha		A large actively swimming, soft bodied animal, with fins running along the body and on the tail with the head having a pair of tentacles, as well as hard tooth-like plates in its mouth, suggesting its affinities with modern invertebrate group Gnathifera. Has been recently suggested to be an early offshoot of the chaetognath (arrow worm) lineage	
Odontogriphus	Lophotrochozoa	Mollusca?	221 specimens	a genus of soft-bodied animal known from middle Cambrian Lagerstätte. Reaching as much as 12.5 centimetres (4.9 in) in length, Odontogriphus was a flat, oval bilaterian which apparently had a single muscular foot, and a "shell" on its back that was moderately rigid but consisted of a material unsuited to fossilization. Current studies suggest a close affinity towards molluscs.	
Metaspriggina	Chordata	stem-Vertebrata	46 specimens	A genus of animal that is considered to represent one of the most primitive known vertebrates. It lacked fins and it had a weakly developed cranium, but it did possess two well-developed eyes.	
Pikaia	Chordata	Primitive		A basal chordate described in 1911 by Walcott as an annelid worm, and in 1979 by Harry B. Whittington and Simon Conway Morris as a chordate. It became the "most famous early chordate fossil." Probably descended from an even earlier chordate based on fossil material from China, Pikaia swam through the Cambrian oceans like a modern fish. Originally thought to be the most primitive chordate, it had two lobe-like appendages on its head unlike vertebrates.	

=== Trace fossils ===
Although trace fossils are rare in the Burgess Shale, arthropod trackways have been recovered.

== Significance ==
Analysis of the Burgess Shale fossils has been important to the interpretation of the Precambrian and Cambrian fossil records, and thus to scientific understanding of the nature of early evolution. English geologist and palaeontologist William Buckland (1784–1856) realised that a dramatic change in the fossil record occurred around the start of the Cambrian period, 539 million years ago. The earliest Cambrian trilobite fossils are about 530 million years old, but were already both diverse and widespread, suggesting that the group had a long, hidden history. The earliest fossils widely accepted as echinoderms appeared at about the same time Because Darwin's contemporaries had insufficient information to establish relative dates of Cambrian rocks, they had the impression that animals appeared instantaneously. Charles Darwin regarded the solitary existence of Cambrian trilobites and total absence of other intermediate fossils as the "gravest" problem to his theory of natural selection, and he devoted an entire chapter of The Origin of Species on the matter. He speculated that the phenomenon, now known as the Cambrian explosion, was a product of gaps in the sequence of fossil-bearing rocks and in contemporary knowledge of those rocks.

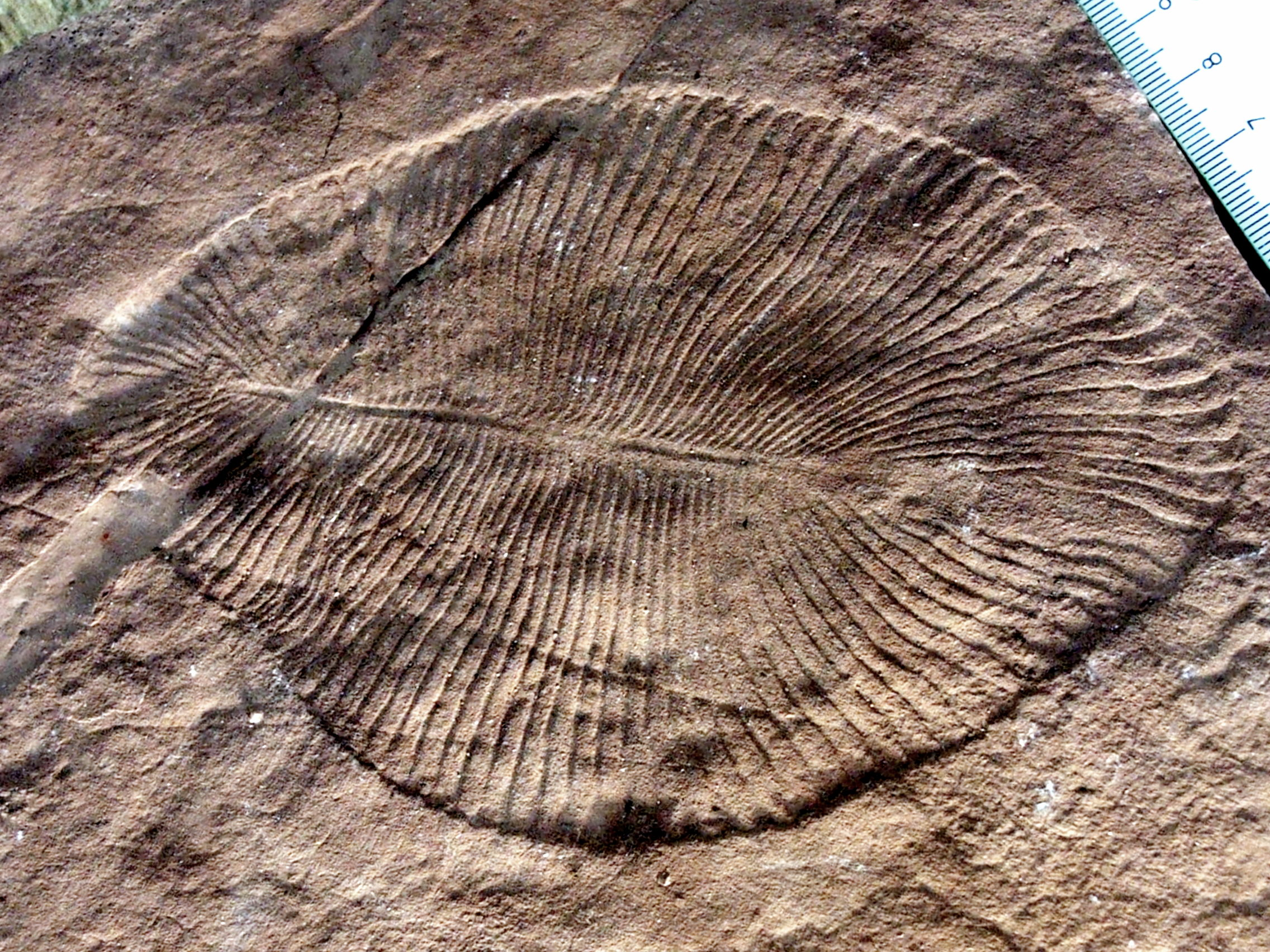
Dickinsonia, one of the fossils Sprigg discovered in the Ediacara Hills

While some geological evidence was presented to suggest that earlier fossils did exist, for a long time this evidence was widely rejected. Fossils from the Ediacaran period, immediately preceding the Cambrian, were first found in 1868, but scientists at that time assumed there was no Precambrian life and therefore dismissed them as products of physical processes. Between 1883 and 1909 Walcott discovered other Precambrian fossils, which were accepted at the time. However, in 1931 Albert Seward dismissed all claims to have found Precambrian fossils. In 1946, Reg Sprigg noticed "jellyfishes" in rocks from Australia's Ediacara Hills. However, while these are now understood as coming from the Ediacaran period, they were thought at the time to have been formed in the Cambrian. From 1872 onwards small shelly fossils, none more than a few millimeters in size, were found in very Early Cambrian rocks, and later also found in rocks dating to the end of the preceding Ediacaran period, but scientists only started in the 1960s to recognize that these were left by a wide range of animals, some of which are now recognized as molluscs.

Darwin's view – that gaps in the fossil record accounted for the apparently sudden appearance of diverse life forms – still had scientific support over a century later. In the early 1970s Wyatt Durham and Martin Glaessner both argued that the animal kingdom had a long Proterozoic history that was hidden by the lack of fossils. However, Preston Cloud held a different view about the origins of complex life, writing in 1948 and 1968 that the evolution of animals in the Early Cambrian was "explosive". This "explosive" view was supported by the hypothesis of punctuated equilibrium, which Eldredge and Gould developed in the early 1970s—which views evolution as long intervals of near-stasis "punctuated" by short periods of rapid change.

The fossils of the Burgess Shale were hidden in store rooms until the 1960s. When Whittington and his colleagues first began to publish their Burgess finds in the early 1970s, the fossils became central to the debate about how quickly animals arose, and were interpreted as evidence that all the living bilaterian phyla had appeared in the Early Cambrian, along with many other phyla that had become extinct by the end of the Cambrian.

Stem groups: — = Lines of descent; = Basal node; = Crown node; = Total group; = Crown group; = Stem group

However, at this time, cladistics, which appeared in the 1950s, was starting to change scientists' approach to biological classification. Unlike previous methods, cladistics attempts to consider all the characteristics of an organism, rather than those subjectively chosen as most important. As a result, it gives less significance to unique or bizarre characteristics than to those that are shared, since only the latter can demonstrate relationships. Cladistics also emphasises the concept of a monophyletic group, in other words one that consists only of a common ancestor and all its descendants – for example it regards the traditional term "reptile" as useless, since mammals and birds are descendants of different groups of "reptiles", but are not considered "reptiles". The concepts of crown groups and stem groups, first presented in English in 1979, are consequences of this approach. A crown group is a monophyletic group of living organisms, and a stem group is a non-monophyletic set of organisms that do not have all the shared features of the crown group but have enough to distinguish them clearly from close relatives of other crown groups – in very simple terms, they are "evolutionary aunts" of the organisms in the crown group. Phyla are crown groups, and the fact that some of their characteristics are considered defining features is simply a consequence of the fact that their ancestors survived while closely related lineages became extinct.

- - lobopods,
    including Aysheaia and Peripatus
  - - - armored lobopods,
        including Hallucigenia and Microdictyon
      - - anomalocarid-like taxa,
          including modern tardigrades as
          well as extinct animals like
          Kerygmachela and Opabinia
        - - Anomalocaris
          - arthropods,
            including living groups and
            extinct forms such as trilobites

Simplified summary of Budd's "broad-scale" cladogram (1996)
of arthropods and their closest relatives

Briggs and Whittington started experimenting with cladistics in 1980 to 1981 and the results, while full of uncertainties, convinced them that cladistics offered reasonable prospects of making sense of the Burgess Shale animals. Other fossil beds discovered since 1980 – some rather small and others rivalling the Burgess Shale – have also produced similar collections of fossils, and show that the types of animals they represent lived in seas all over the world. It appears that most of the major animal lineages had arisen before the time of the Burgess Shale, and before that of the Chengjiang and Sirius Passet lagerstätten about 15 million years earlier, in which very similar fossils are found, and that the Cambrian explosion was complete by then. In the 1990s it was suggested that some Ediacaran fossils from 555 to 542 million years ago, just before the start of the Cambrian, may have been primitive bilaterians, and one, Kimberella, may have been a primitive mollusc. By 1996, with new fossil discoveries filling in some of the gaps in the "family tree", some Burgess Shale "weird wonders" such as Hallucinogenia and Opabinia were seen as stem members of a total group that included arthropods and some other living phyla.

== See also ==
- Dictyophycus
- Molaria
- Thelxiope
- Tubullela
- Worthenella
