= Homoplasy =

Gain or loss of the same feature independently in separate lineages during evolution

Homoplasy, in biology and phylogenetics, is the term used to describe a feature that has been gained or lost independently in separate lineages over the course of evolution. This is different from homology, which is the term used to characterize the similarity of features that can be parsimoniously explained by common ancestry. Homoplasy can arise from both similar selection pressures acting on adapting species, and the effects of genetic drift.

Homoplasy is the similarity in a feature that is not parsimoniously explained by descent from a common ancestor.

Most often, homoplasy is viewed as a similarity in morphological characters. However, homoplasy may also appear in other character types, such as similarity in the genetic sequence, life cycle types or even behavioral traits.

== Etymology ==
The term homoplasy was first used by Ray Lankester in 1870. The corresponding adjective is either homoplasic or homoplastic. It is derived from the two Ancient Greek words ὁμός (homós), meaning "similar, alike, the same", and πλάσσω (plássō), meaning "to shape, to mold".

== Parallelism and convergence ==
Parallel and convergent evolution lead to homoplasy when different species independently evolve or gain apparently identical features, which are different from the feature inferred to have been present in their common ancestor. When the similar features are caused by an equivalent developmental mechanism, the process is referred to as parallel evolution. The process is called convergent evolution when the similarity arises from different developmental mechanisms. These types of homoplasy may occur when different lineages live in comparable ecological niches that require similar adaptations for an increase in fitness. An interesting example is that of the marsupial moles (Notoryctidae), golden moles (Chrysochloridae) and northern moles (Talpidae). These are mammals from different geographical regions and lineages, and have all independently evolved very similar burrowing characteristics (such as cone-shaped heads and flat frontal claws) to live in a subterranean ecological niche.

== Reversion ==
In contrast, reversal (a.k.a. vestigialization) leads to homoplasy through the disappearance of previously gained features. This process may result from changes in the environment in which certain gained characteristics are no longer relevant, or have even become costly. This can be observed in subterranean and cave-dwelling animals by their loss of sight, in cave-dwelling animals through their loss of pigmentation, and in both snakes and legless lizards through their loss of limbs.

== Distinguishing homology from homoplasy ==
Homoplasy, especially the type that occurs in more closely related phylogenetic groups, can make phylogenetic analysis more challenging. Phylogenetic trees are often selected by means of parsimony analysis. These analyses can be done with phenotypic characters, as well as DNA sequences. Using parsimony analysis, the hypothesis of relationships that requires the fewest (or least costly) character state transformations is preferred over alternative hypotheses. Evaluation of these trees may become a challenge when clouded by the occurrence of homoplasy in the characters used for the analysis. The most important approach to overcoming these challenges is to increase the number of independent (non-pleiotropic, non-linked) characteristics used in the phylogenetic analysis. Along with parsimony analysis, one could perform a likelihood analysis, where the most likely tree, given a particular model of evolution, is selected, and branch lengths are inferred.

According to the cladistic interpretation, homoplasy is invoked when the distribution of a character state cannot be explained parsimoniously (without extra inferred character state transformations between the terminals and their ancestral node) on a preferred phylogenetic hypothesis - that is, the feature in question arises (or disappears) at more than one point on the tree.

In the case of DNA sequences, homoplasy is very common due to the redundancy of the genetic code. An observed homoplasy may simply be the result of random nucleotide substitutions accumulating over time, and thus may not need an adaptationist evolutionary explanation.

== Examples and applications of homoplasy ==
There are numerous documented examples of homoplasy within the following taxa:

- Eusiroidea (crustaceans and Amphipoda)
- Urticaceae
- Asteraceae
- Polypodioideae (Selligueoid Ferns)
- Ants
- Merluccius capensis (cape hakes)
- Tarantula spiders of the genus Bonnetina: nearly all morphological traits within this genus are homoplastic. Only sexual features were observed to not be homoplastic, suggesting that sexual selection may have been a driving force in the divergence of tarantulas.
- Gharials, with homoplasy between Tomistoma and true crocodiles, and between Thoracosaurus and Gavialis.

The occurrence of homoplasy can also be used to make predictions about evolution. Recent studies have used homoplasy to predict the possibility and the path of extraterrestrial evolution. For example, Levin et al. (2017) suggest that the development of eye-like structures is highly likely, due to its numerous, independently evolved incidences on earth.

== Homoplasy vs. evolutionary contingency ==
In his book Wonderful Life, Stephen Jay Gould claims that repeating the evolutionary process, from any point in time onward, would not produce the same results. The occurrence of homoplasy is viewed by some biologists as an argument against Gould's theory of evolutionary contingency. Powell & Mariscal (2015) argue that this disagreement is caused by an equivocation and that both the theory of contingency and homoplastic occurrence can be true at the same time.

== See also ==
- Convergent evolution
- Incomplete lineage sorting
- Heteroplasmy
- Homology (biology)
