= Divergent evolution =

Accumulation of genetic differences

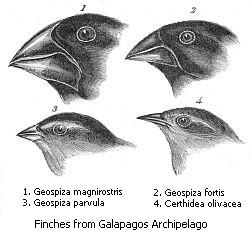
Darwin's finches are a clear and famous example of divergent evolution, in which an ancestral species radiates into a number of descendant species with both similar and different traits.

Divergent evolution or divergent selection is the accumulation of differences between closely related populations within a species, sometimes leading to speciation. It can occur when two populations become separated by some barrier (such as physical separation in allopatric or peripatric speciation) and become subject to differing selective pressures and potentially genetic drift. If sufficient evolutionary distance accumulates, the derived populations may become reproductively incompatible through various types of physiological or behavioral barriers. Charles Darwin discussed an early version of the concept at length, but the American naturalist J. T. Gulick (1832–1923) was the first to use the term "divergent evolution" specifically, and it has since become a foundational concept in evolutionary biology. Examples of divergence in nature are the adaptive radiation of the finches of the Galápagos, changes in mobbing behavior of the kittiwake, and the evolution of the modern-day dog from the wolf.

The term can also be applied in molecular evolution, such as to proteins that derive from homologous sequences in diverged populations. Two or more genes that descend from a single ancestor and reside in diverged populations are said to be orthologs, and those duplicated prior to speciation are said to be paralogs. Paralogs can be further distinguished as alloparalogs (duplicates in the same population) or symparalogs (genes in diverged populations which descend from different alloparalogs in an ancestral population). The degree of divergence between various homologous sequences is a common metric for estimating past divergent selection on them. Importantly, sequence divergence can occur without effects on fitness, thus resulting in drift rather than adaptive divergence, as is the case in silent mutations, some synonymous substitutions, or in stable mutation-selection balance. It is the position of Motoo Kimura's neutral theory and later Tomoko Ohta's nearly neutral theory that the large majority of divergent molecular evolution across the tree of life is effectively neutral with regards to fitness.

== Causes ==
In the broad sense, populations undergo divergent evolution as a fundamental result of genetic replication being imperfect. Specifically with regards to adaptive divergence, any strength or dynamic of natural selection which occurs differentially across two recently separated populations can result in divergence as they adapt alongside their changing fitness landscapes. Contributors to adaptive divergence may be environmental, ecological, or intraspecific effects such as sexual selection or changes in behavioral ecology. Common natural examples include abiotic factors such as continental drift and geologic climate change, and ecological factors such as alternations in predator-prey dynamics, or mutualisms if coevolving populations (such as parasites) differ across separated populations. Divergent evolution can also result from domestication and selective breeding by humans.

== Distinctions ==
Divergent evolution is a type of evolution and is distinct from convergent evolution and parallel evolution, although it does share similarities with the other types of evolution.

=== Divergent versus convergent evolution ===
Convergent evolution is the development of analogous structures that occurs in different species as a result of those two species facing similar environmental pressures and adapting in similar ways. It differs from divergent evolution as the species involved do not descend from a closely related common ancestor and the traits accumulated are similar. An example of convergent evolution is the development of flight in birds, bats, and insects, all of which are not closely related but share analogous structures allowing for flight.

=== Divergent versus parallel evolution ===
Parallel evolution is the development of a similar trait in species descending from a common ancestor. It is comparable to divergent evolution in that the species are descend from a common ancestor, but the traits accumulated are similar due to similar environmental pressures while in divergent evolution the traits accumulated are different. An example of parallel evolution is that certain arboreal frog species, 'flying' frogs, in both Old World families and New World families, have developed the ability of gliding flight. They have "enlarged hands and feet, full webbing between all fingers and toes, lateral skin flaps on the arms and legs, and reduced weight per snout-vent length".

== Example organisms ==
=== Darwin's finches ===
One of the first recorded examples of divergent evolution is the case of Darwin's Finches. During Darwin's travels to the Galápagos Islands, he discovered several different species of finch, living on the different islands. Darwin observed that the finches had different beaks specialized for that species of finches' diet. Some finches had short beaks for eating nuts and seeds, other finches had long thin beaks for eating insects, and others had beaks specialized for eating cacti and other plants. He concluded that the finches evolved from a shared common ancestor that lived on the islands, and due to geographic isolation, evolved to fill the particular niche on each of the islands. This is supported by modern day genomic sequencing.

=== Dogs ===
Another example of divergent evolution is the origin of the domestic dog and the modern wolf, who both shared a common ancestor. Comparing the anatomy of dogs and wolves supports this claim as they have similar body shape, skull size, and limb formation. This is even more obvious in some breeds of dogs, such as malamutes and huskies, who appear even more physically and behaviorally similar. There is a divergent genomic sequence of the mitochondrial DNA of wolves and dogs dated to over 100,000 years ago, which further supports the theory that dogs and wolves have diverged from shared ancestry.

=== Kittiwakes ===
Another example of divergent evolution is the behavioral changes in the kittiwake as opposed to other species of gulls. Ancestorial and other modern-day species of gulls exhibit a mobbing behavior in order to protect their young, due to nesting at ground-level where they are susceptible to predators. As a result of migration and environmental changes, the kittiwake nest solely on cliff faces. As a result, their young are protected from predatory reptiles, mammals, and birds who struggle with the climb and cliff-face weather conditions, and they do not exhibit this mobbing behavior.

=== Cacti ===
Another example of divergent evolution is the split forming the Cactaceae family approximately dated in the late Miocene. Due to increase in arid climates, following the Eocene–Oligocene event, these ancestral plants evolved to survive in the new climates. Cacti evolved to have areoles, succulent stems, and some have light leaves, with the ability to store water for up to months. The plants they diverged from either went extinct leaving little in the fossil record or migrated surviving in less arid climates.

== See also ==
- Genetic divergence
- Cladistics
- Contingency (evolutionary biology)
- Devolution
- Chronospecies
