= An Urchin in the Storm =

1987 book by Stephen Jay Gould

- Author: Stephen Jay Gould
- Illustrator: David Levine
- Language: English
- Subjects: Science; History of science
- Publisher: W.W. Norton
- Publication date: 1987
- Publication place: United States
- Media type: Print (Hardcover and Paperback)
- Pages: 255 pp.
- ISBN: 0-393-02492-X
- OCLC: 16472146
- Dewey Decimal: 574 19
- LC Class: QH311 .G68 1987
- Preceded by: Time's Arrow, Time's Cycle
- Followed by: Wonderful Life

An Urchin in the Storm is a 1987 essay collection from paleontologist and science writer Stephen Jay Gould.

== Overview ==
All but one of the essays had originally appeared in The New York Review of Books. Grouped by theme, the sections of the book deal respectively with the irreducibility of history (and the pleasures and challenges of contingency) in its two principal domains of life and the earth, nature's complexity, the theory and consequences of biological determinism, and rationalism in explanation. The book is dedicated to Peter Medawar and Isaiah Berlin.

It was reviewed in The New York Times by Michiko Kakutani, who noted that although the pieces were technically book reviews, Gould "tends to use the subject at hand as a jumping-off point for more general discussions".
