= Wonderful Life (book) =

1989 book by Stephen Jay Gould

- Cover of the first edition
- Author: Stephen Jay Gould
- Language: English
- Subjects: Evolutionary history of life Burgess Shale
- Publisher: W. W. Norton & Co.
- Publication date: 1989
- Publication place: United States
- Media type: Print (Hardcover and Paperback)
- Pages: 347 pp.
- ISBN: 0-393-02705-8
- OCLC: 18983518
- Dewey Decimal: 560/.9 19
- LC Class: QE770 .G67 1989
- Preceded by: An Urchin in the Storm
- Followed by: Bully for Brontosaurus

Wonderful Life: The Burgess Shale and the Nature of History is a 1989 book on the evolution of Cambrian fauna by Harvard paleontologist Stephen Jay Gould. The volume made The New York Times Best Seller list, was the 1991 winner of the Royal Society's Rhone-Poulenc Prize and the Council for Secular Humanism's Forkosch Award, and was a 1990 finalist for the Pulitzer Prize. Gould's 1996 Full House is a companion to Wonderful Life.

== Summary ==
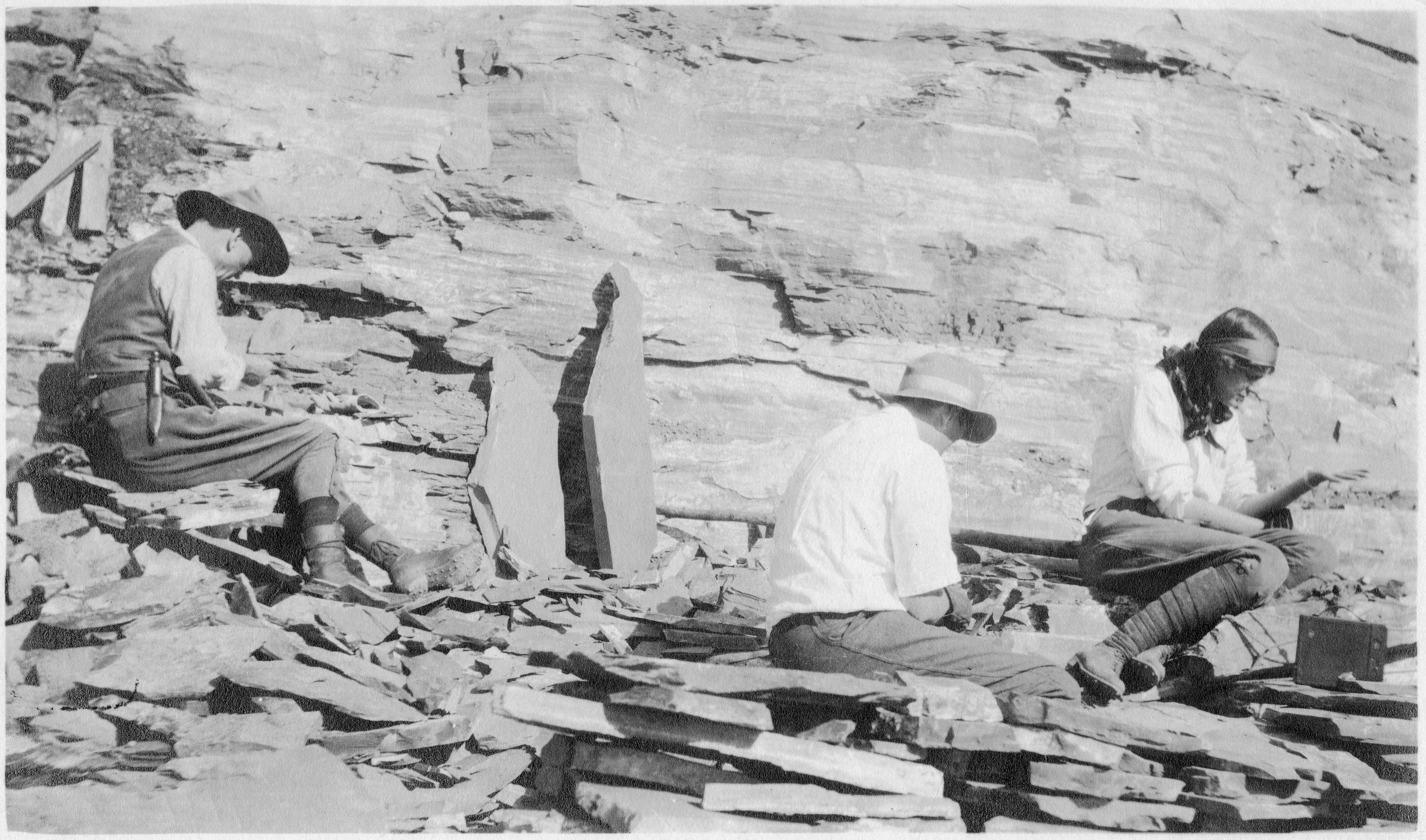
Charles Doolittle Walcott (1850-1927), who discovered the Burgess Shale, with his children Sidney Stevens Walcott (1892-1977), and Helen Breese Walcott (1894-1965).

Wonderful Life was inspired by two major events in the discovery and understanding of Burgess Shale animals from the Canadian Rockies. The first is the initial discovery of Charles Doolittle Walcott who collected tens of thousands of fossils of different animals from the Cambrian rocks, of about 505 million years old. Between 1910 and 1924, Walcott had collected so many Cambrian fossils that he could not identify or describe them all, and was compelled, as Gould described, "shoehorned" them into known groups of animal (phyla) as he liked, thereby making many mistakes. This limitation made Walcott unable to work out the real evolutionary importance of these fossils.

The second is the research development made by University of Cambridge palaentologist by Harry B. Whittington with his doctoral students Simon Conway Morris and Derek Briggs. The British scholars established the diversity and evolutionary picture of the Cambrian animals, from about 70,000 specimens, in a relatively short period of geological time that the event became popularly known as Cambrian explosion.

Gould regarded Opabinia – an odd creature with five eyes and frontal nozzle – as so important to understanding the Cambrian explosion that he wanted to call his book Homage to Opabinia. Gould wrote:

I believe that Whittington's reconstruction of Opabinia in 1975 will stand as one of the great documents in the history of human knowledge. How many other empirical studies have led directly on to a fundamentally revised view about the history of life? We are awestruck by Tyrannosaurus; we marvel at the feathers of Archaeopteryx; we revel in every scrap of fossil human bone from Africa. But none of these has taught us anywhere near so much about the nature of evolution as a little two-inch Cambrian oddball invertebrate named Opabinia.

Gould's thesis from the Cambrian explosion was "predictability of life" in terms of evolutionary products, meaning that contingency plays a major role in the evolutionary history of life. Gould argues that during this period just after the Cambrian explosion there was a greater disparity of anatomical body plans (phyla) than exist today. However most of these phyla left no modern descendants. All of the Burgess animals, Gould argues, were exquisitely adapted to their environment, and there exists little evidence that the survivors were any better adapted than their extinct contemporaries.

Gould proposed that given a chance to "rewind the tape of life" and let it play again, we might find ourselves living in a world populated by descendants of Hallucigenia rather than Pikaia (the ancestor of all vertebrates, or at least a close relative thereof). Gould stressed that his argument was not based on randomness but rather contingency, a process by which historical outcomes arise from an unpredictable sequence of antecedent states, where any change in the sequence alters the final result. Because fitness for existing conditions does not guarantee long-term survival – particularly when conditions change catastrophically – the survival of many species depends more on luck than conventional features of anatomical superiority. Gould maintains that, "traits that enhance survival during an extinction do so in ways that are incidental and unrelated to the causes of their evolution in the first place." Gould earlier coined the term exaptation to describe fortuitously beneficial traits, which are adaptive but arise for reasons other than incremental natural selection.

The ultimate message of Wonderful Life is in the last page titled "An epilogue on Pikaia" which Gould said that he had "to save the best for the last," making a statement:

Pikaia is the missing and final link in our story of contingency—the direct connection between Burgess decimation and eventual human evolution... Wind the tape of life back to Burgess times, and let it play again. If Pikaia does not survive in the replay, we are wiped out of future history—all of us, from shark to robin to orangutan... And so, if you wish to ask the question of the age—why do humans exist?—a major part of the answer, touching those aspects of the issue that science can treat at all, must be: because Pikaia survived the Burgess decimation.

== Reception ==
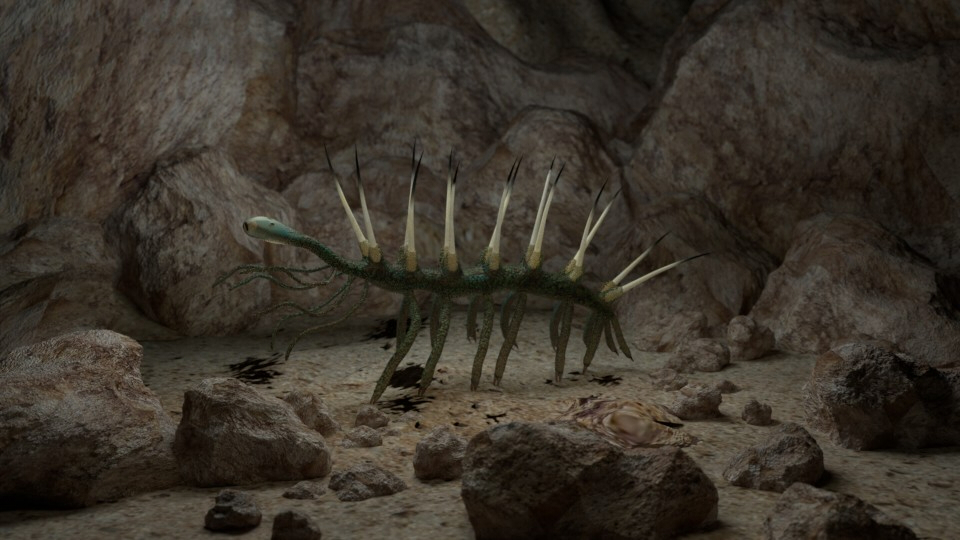
Modern artistic rendering of Hallucigenia.

Wonderful Life quickly climbed the national bestseller lists within weeks of publication. In The New York Times review, James Gleick praised Gould for the book: "The last two decades have seen many other sciences, without benefit of Burgess Shales, evolve a stronger appreciation of the roles of contingency and catastrophe. And within paleontology, quite apart from the evidence of the Canadian fossils, many voices have been making the case for a more chance-ridden, less progress-oriented view of life - none, in fact, more vigorously than Mr. Gould." The book stimulated wide discussion and debate regarding the nature of progress and contingency in evolution. Gould described his later book Full House (1996) as a companion volume to Wonderful Life.

Gould's thesis was that if the history of life were replayed over again, human-level intelligence would prove unlikely to ever arise again. The evolutionary biologist Ernst Mayr argued that Gould, "made such contingencies a major theme in Wonderful Life, and I have come to the conclusion that here he may be largely right." In his review, the biologist Richard Dawkins wrote that, "The view that he is attacking – that evolution marches inexorably towards a pinnacle such as man – has not been believed for 50 years."

Biologist John Maynard Smith wrote, "I agree with Gould that evolution is not in general predictable. ... Although I agree with Gould about contingency, I find the problem of progress harder. ... I do think that progress has happened, although I find it hard to define precisely what I mean." Philosopher Michael Ruse wrote that, "Wonderful Life was the best book written by the late Stephen Jay Gould, paleontologist and popular science writer. It is ... a thrilling story that Gould tells in a way that no one else could equal."

Some of the anatomical reconstructions cited by Gould were soon challenged as being incorrect, most notably Simon Conway Morris' 1977 reconstruction of Hallucigenia. Conway Morris' reconstruction was, "so peculiar, so hard to imagine as an efficiently working beast" Gould speculated that Hallucigenia might be "a complex appendage of a larger creature, still undiscovered." It was later brought to light by paleontologists Lars Ramskold and Hou Xianguang that Conway Morris' reconstruction was inverted upside down, and likely belonged to the modern phylum Onychophora.

The book and its scientific message became hugely influential, and according to Michael Ruse, a philosopher of science at Florida State University, it "was the best book written by the late Stephen Jay Gould" that made Cambrian explosion into public interest. Gould, from this statement, is regarded as "the most famous proponent" of evolutionary contingency. The ultimate theme of the book, evolutionary contingency, became one of the most influential philosophical concepts in biology that is still being debated among evolutionary biologists today. His idea has inspired many research involving evolutionary contingency in different branches of biology. According to him, contingency is a major factor that drives large-scale evolution (macroevolution) and dictates that evolution has no inevitable destiny or outcome. However, as Gould explained, "The bad news is that we can't possibly perform the experiment."

== Awards ==
Wonderful Life made into The New York Times Best Seller list. It won the 1990 the Phi Beta Kappa Book Award in Science and the 1991 Morris D. Forkosch Book Award instituted by the Council for Secular Humanism (renamed Center for Inquiry) and the Morris D. Forkosch Endowment Fund. In 1990, it was the finalist for the Pulitzer Prize in General Nonfiction. One of jurors Joyce Carol Oates later revealed that the non-fiction jury had unanimously recommended the book for the prize, but the selection was rejected by the Pulitzer board. In 1991, it received the Royal Society's Rhone-Poulenc Prize. In 1991, Gould was given the Golden Trilobite Award for excellence in paleontological writing from the Paleontological Society, in part based on Wonderful Life.

== See also ==
- March of Progress (illustration)
