= Simon Conway Morris =

British palaeontologist (born 1951)

Simon Conway Morris FRS
- Born: 6 November 1951 (age 74); Carshalton, England, United Kingdom
- Education: University of Bristol (BSc); St John's College, Cambridge (PhD)
- Known for: Studies of Burgess Shale fossils and the Cambrian explosion
- Awards: Walcott Medal (1987); Charles Schuchert Award (1989); Lyell Medal (1998); Trotter Prize (2007); William Bate Hardy Prize (2010); Templeton Prize (2026)
- Scientific career
- Fields: Paleontology
- Workplaces: University of Cambridge
- Doctoral advisor: Harry Blackmore Whittington

Simon Conway Morris FRS (born 6 November 1951) is an English palaeontologist, evolutionary biologist, and astrobiologist known for his study of the fossils of the Burgess Shale and the Cambrian explosion. The results of these discoveries were celebrated in Stephen Jay Gould's 1989 book Wonderful Life. Conway Morris's own book on the subject, The Crucible of Creation (1998), however, is critical of Gould's presentation and interpretation.

Conway Morris held the Chair of Evolutionary Palaeobiology in the Department of Earth Sciences, University of Cambridge between 1995 and 2019 and is now Emeritus Professor.

== Biography ==
=== Early years ===
Conway Morris was born on 6 November 1951 in Carshalton, Surrey. He was brought up in London, England, and went on to study geology at Bristol University, achieving a First Class Honours degree. He then moved to Cambridge University and completed a PhD at St John's College under Harry Blackmore Whittington. He is professor of evolutionary palaeobiology in the Department of Earth Sciences at Cambridge. He is renowned for his insights into early evolution and his studies of paleobiology. He gave the Royal Institution Christmas Lecture in 1996 on the subject of The History in our Bones. He was elected a Fellow of the Royal Society at age 39, and was awarded the Walcott Medal of the National Academy of Sciences in 1987 and the Lyell Medal of the Geological Society of London in 1998.

=== Work ===
Conway Morris is based in the Department of Earth Sciences at the University of Cambridge and is best known for his work on the Cambrian explosion, the Burgess Shale fossil fauna and similar deposits in China and Greenland. In addition to working in these countries he has undertaken research in Australia, Canada, Mongolia and the United States. His studies on the Burgess Shale-type faunas, as well as the early evolution of skeletons, has encompassed a wide variety of groups, ranging from ctenophores to the earliest vertebrates. His thinking on the significance of the Burgess Shale has evolved and his current interest in evolutionary convergence and its wider significance – the topic of his 2007 Gifford Lectures – was in part spurred by Stephen Jay Gould's arguments for the importance of contingency in the history of life.

In January 2017, his team announced the discovery of Saccorhytus and initially described it as an early member of the deuterostomes which contain a diverse group of animals including vertebrates, but subsequent analysis reclassified this taxon as a member of the protostomes, probably within the ecdysozoans.

==== Burgess Shale ====
Conway Morris' views on the Burgess Shale are reported in numerous technical papers and more generally in The Crucible of Creation (Oxford University Press, 1998). In recent years he has been investigating the phenomenon of evolutionary convergence, the main thesis of which is put forward in Life's Solution: Inevitable Humans in a Lonely Universe (Cambridge University Press, 2003). He is now involved on a major project to investigate both the scientific ramifications of convergence and also to establish a website (www.mol.org/) that aims to provide an easily accessible introduction to the thousands of known examples of convergence. This work is funded by the John Templeton Foundation.

==== Evolution, science and religion ====
Conway Morris is active in the public understanding of science and has broadcast extensively on radio and television. The latter includes the Royal Institution Christmas Lectures delivered in 1996. A Christian, he believes in theistic evolution and opposes intelligent design but believes in an intelligent designer. He has participated in science and religion debates, including arguments against intelligent design on the one hand and materialism on the other. In 2005 he gave the second Boyle Lecture. He has lectured at the Faraday Institute for Science and Religion on "Evolution and fine-tuning in Biology". He gave the University of Edinburgh Gifford Lectures for 2007 in a series titled "Darwin's Compass: How Evolution Discovers the Song of Creation". In these lectures Conway Morris explained why evolution is compatible with belief in the existence of a God.

He is a critic of materialism and of reductionism:

That satisfactory definitions of life elude us may be one hint that when materialists step forward and declare with a brisk slap of the hands that this is it, we should be deeply skeptical. Whether the "it" be that of Richard Dawkins' reductionist gene-centred worldpicture, the "universal acid" of Daniel Dennett's meaningless Darwinism, or David Sloan Wilson's faith in group selection (not least to explain the role of human religions), we certainly need to acknowledge each provides insights but as total explanations of what we see around us they are, to put it politely, somewhat incomplete.

and of scientists who are militantly against religion:

the scientist who boomingly – and they always boom – declares that those who believe in the Deity are unavoidably crazy, "cracked" as my dear father would have said, although I should add that I have every reason to believe he was – and now hope is – on the side of the angels.

In March 2009 he was the opening speaker at the Biological Evolution: Facts and Theories conference held at the Pontifical Gregorian University in Rome, as well as chairing one of the sessions. The conference was sponsored by the Catholic Church. Conway Morris has contributed articles on evolution and Christian belief to several collections, including The Cambridge Companion to Science and Religion (2010) and The Blackwell Companion to Science and Christianity (2012).

Simon Conway Morris appointments and accomplishments
Date	Position
1969–1972	University of Bristol: First Class Honours in Geology (BSc)
1975	Elected Fellow (Title A) of St John's College
1976	University of Cambridge: PhD
1976	Research Fellowship at St John's College, University of Cambridge
1979	Lecturer in Department of Earth Sciences, Open University
1983	Lecturer in Department of Earth Sciences, University of Cambridge
1987–1988	Awarded a One-Year Science Research Fellowship by the Nuffield Foundation
1990	Elected Fellow of the Royal Society
1991	Appointed Reader in Evolutionary Palaeobiology
1995	Elected to an ad hominem Chair in Evolutionary Palaeobiology
1997–2002	Natural Environment Research Council

== Awards and honours ==
- The Walcott Medal 1987
- PS Charles Schuchert Award 1989
- Honorary doctorate Uppsala University (1993)
- GSL Charles Lyell Medal 1998
- Trotter Prize 2007
- Templeton Prize 2026

== Bibliography ==
- The Early Evolution of Metazoa and the Significance of Problematic Taxa. (ed., with Alberto M. Simonetta) Cambridge University Press, 1991. ISBN 0-521-40242-5
- The Crucible of Creation: The Burgess Shale and the Rise of Animals. Oxford University Press. 1998. ISBN 0-19-850256-7.
- "The Cambrian "Explosion" of Metazoans". OCLC 95979505 in Origination of Organismal Form: Beyond the Gene in Developmental and Evolutionary Biology, 2003, ISBN 0-262-13419-5
- Life's Solution: Inevitable Humans in a Lonely Universe. Cambridge University Press. 2003. ISBN 0-521-60325-0.
- The Deep Structure of Biology. (ed.) Templeton Foundation Press, 2008. ISBN 1-59947-138-8
- Fitness of the Cosmos for Life: Biochemistry and Fine-Tuning. (ed., with John D. Barrow, Stephen J. Freeland, Charles L. Harper, Jr.) Cambridge University Press, 2008. ISBN 978-0-521-87102-0
- Water and Life: The Unique Properties of H_{2}O. (ed., with Ruth M. Lynden-Bell, John D. Barrow, John L. Finney, Charles Harper, Jr.) CRC Press, 2010. ISBN 1-4398-0356-0
- The Runes of Evolution: How the Universe became Self-Aware. Templeton Press, 2015
- From Extraterrestrials to Animal Minds: Six Myths of Evolution. Templeton Press, 2022

== See also ==
Extraterrestrial (TV program) in which Conway Morris participates.
