= Parallel evolution =

Similar evolution in distinct species

Parallel evolution is the similar development of a trait in distinct species that are not closely related, but share a similar original trait in response to similar evolutionary pressure.

== Parallel vs. convergent evolution ==
Evolution at an amino acid position. In each case, the left-hand species changes from incorporating alanine (A) at a specific position within a protein in a hypothetical common ancestor deduced from comparison of sequences of several species, and now incorporates serine (S) in its present-day form. The right-hand species may undergo divergent evolution (alanine replaced with threonine instead), parallel evolution (alanine also replaced with serine), or convergent evolution (threonine replaced with serine) at this amino acid position relative to that of the first species.

Convergent evolution is the independent evolution of similar features in species of different lineages. Given a trait that occurs in each of two lineages descended from a specified ancestor, it is possible in theory to define parallel and convergent evolutionary trends strictly, and distinguish them clearly from one another. However, the criteria for defining convergent as opposed to parallel evolution are unclear in practice, so that arbitrary diagnosis is common. When two species share a trait, evolution is defined as parallel if the ancestors are known to have shared that similarity; if not, it is defined as convergent. However, the stated conditions are a matter of degree; all organisms share common ancestors. Scientists differ on whether the distinction is useful.

== Parallel evolution between marsupials and placentals ==
A number of examples of parallel evolution are provided by the two main branches of the mammals, the placentals and marsupials, which have followed independent evolutionary pathways following the break-up of land-masses such as Gondwanaland roughly 100 million years ago. In South America, marsupials and placentals shared the ecosystem (before the Great American Interchange); in Australia, marsupials prevailed; and in the Old World and North America the placentals won out. However, in all these localities mammals were small and filled only limited places in the ecosystem until the mass extinction of dinosaurs sixty-five million years ago. At this time, mammals on all three landmasses began to take on a much wider variety of forms and roles. While some forms were unique to each environment, surprisingly similar animals have often emerged in two or three of the separated continents. Examples of these include the placental sabre-toothed cats (Machairodontinae) and the South American marsupial sabre-tooth (Thylacosmilus); the Tasmanian wolf and the European wolf; likewise marsupial and placental moles, flying squirrels, and (arguably) mice.

== Parallel coevolution of traits between hummingbirds and sunbirds contributing to ecological guilds ==
Hummingbirds and sunbirds, two nectarivorous bird lineages in the New and Old Worlds have parallelly evolved a suite of specialized behavioral and anatomical traits. These traits (bill shape, digestive enzymes, and flight) allow the birds to optimally fit the flower-feeding-and-pollination ecological niche they occupy, which is shaped by the birds' suites of parallel traits. Thus, a parallel coevolved behavioral syndrome within the birds creates an emergent guild of highly specialized birds and highly adapted plants, each exploiting the other's involvement in the flowers' pollination in the Old World and New World alike.

The bill shape of nectarivores, being long and needle-like, allows them to reach down a flower's pistil/stamen and get at the nectar within. Nectarivores may also use their specialized bills to engage in nectar robbing, a practice seen in both hummingbirds and sunbirds in which the bird gets nectar by making a hole in the base of the flower's corolla tube instead of inserting its bill through the tube as is standard, thus "robbing" the flower of nectar since it is not pollinated it in return.

Nectarivores and ornithophilous flowers often exist in mutualistic guild relationships facilitated by the bird's bill shape, food source, and digestive ability acting in concert with the flower's tube shape and adaptation to pollination by hovering or perching birds. The birds eat nectar using their long, thin bills and, in so doing, collect pollen on their bills; this pollen is then transferred to the next flower they feed on. This mutualism coevolved in parallel between the Old World and New World birds and their respective flowers. Moreover, the digestive enzyme activity in nectarivores matching the nectar composition in their respective flowers appears to have coevolved in parallel between plants and pollinators across continents, as the nectarivorous lineages independently evolved the ability to digest the nectar specific to their flowers, resulting in distinct guilds.

The capacity of nectarivores to digest sucrose is far greater than that of other avian taxa. This difference is due to an analogous high concentration of sucrase-isomaltase, an enzyme that hydrolyzes sucrose. Sucrase activity per unit intestinal surface area appears to be higher in nectarivores than in other birds, meaning these nectarivorous avians can digest more sucrose more rapidly than other taxa. Moreover, the Adaptive Modulation Hypothesis does not apply for nectarivores and sugar-digesting enzymes, meaning that two lineages of nectarivores should not necessarily both have high sucrase-isomaltase concentrations even though they both eat nectar. Thus, parallel acquisition of analogous sucrose digestive capability is a reasonable conclusion because there is no apparent cause for the two lineages to share this high enzyme concentration.
