= Tubullela =

Tubullela Temporal range: Burgess Shale

Scientific classification
- Kingdom: Animalia
- Phylum: incertae sedis
- Genus: Tubullela

Tubullela is a problematic genus known from the Middle Cambrian Burgess Shale. 118 specimens of Tubullela are known from the Greater Phyllopod bed, where they comprise 0.22% of the community.
