= Dictyophycus =

Dictyophycus Temporal range: Middle Cambrian, 520 Ma

Scientific classification
- Domain: Eukaryota
- (unranked): Archaeplastida
- Division: Rhodophyta
- Genus: Dictyophycus
- Species: D. gracilis

Binomial name
- Dictyophycus gracilis Walcott 1919

Extinct genus of algae

Dictyophycus is a putative red alga of the middle Cambrian Burgess Shale. While alive, it formed leaf-like lobes about 25mm across. The fossils do not preserve the leaf-like membrane, so only the sturdier "skeleton" is known; these are usually broken and detached from their holdfast. 308 specimens of Dictyophycus are known from the Greater Phyllopod bed, where they comprise 0.59% of the community.
