= Derek Briggs =

Irish paleontologist and taphonomist

Derek Ernest Gilmor Briggs
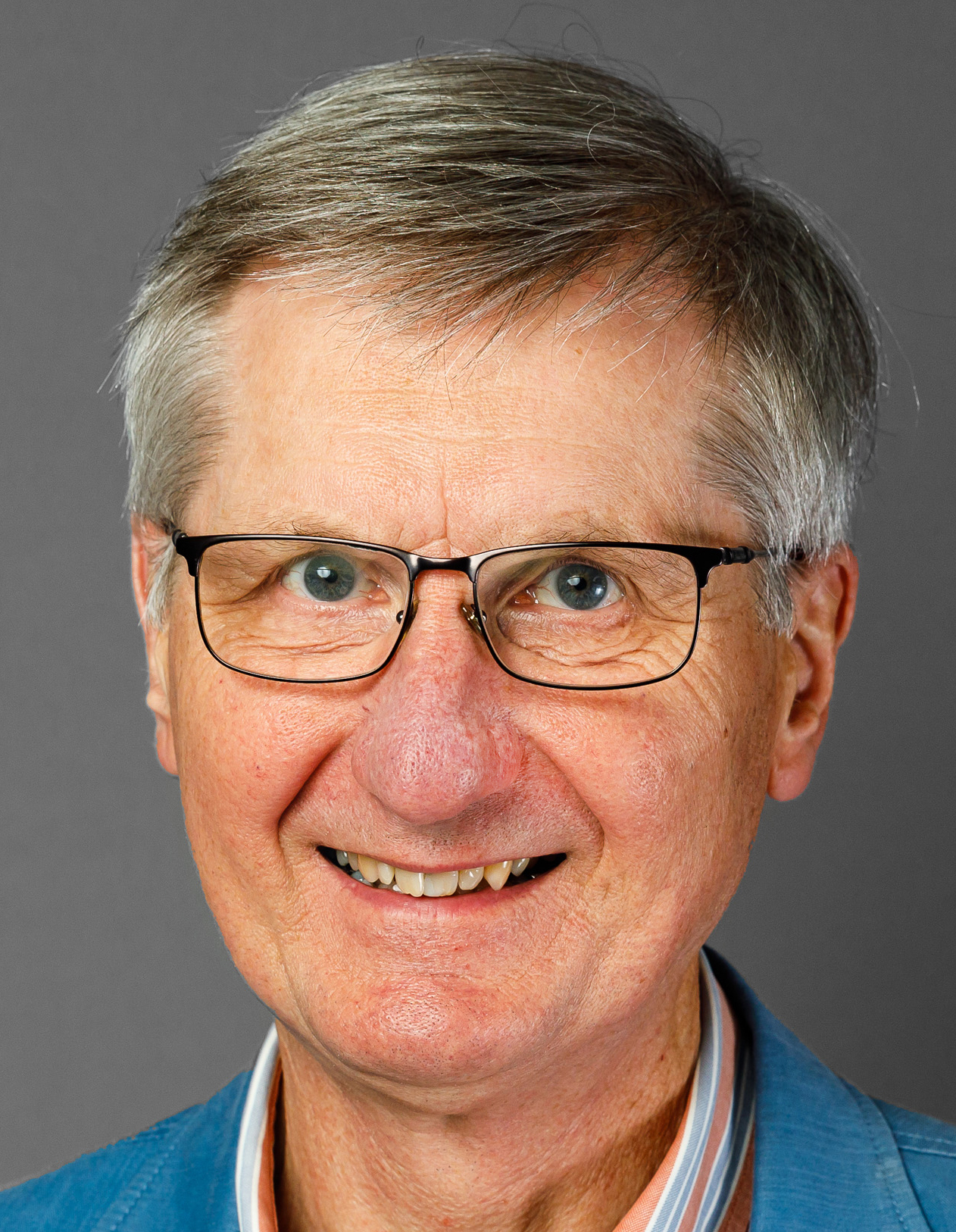
- Born: 10 January 1950 (age 76); Ireland
- Education: Trinity College Dublin; Sidney Sussex College, Cambridge
- Known for: Burgess Shale; Cambrian explosion; Hunsrück Slate
- Awards: FRS (1999); Lyell Medal (2000); Boyle Medal (2001)
- Scientific career
- Fields: Paleontology
- Workplaces: Peabody Museum of Natural History; Goldsmiths, University of London; University of Bristol; Yale University
- Thesis: Arthropods from the Burgess Shale, Middle Cambrian, Canada (1976)
- Doctoral advisor: Harry Whittington
- Website: earth.yale.edu/profile/derek-briggs

Derek Ernest Gilmor Briggs (born 10 January 1950) is an Irish palaeontologist and taphonomist. He is the G. Evelyn Hutchinson Professor in the department of Earth and Planetary Sciences at Yale University and Curator of Invertebrate Paleontology and former Director of the Yale Peabody Museum.

== Early life and education ==
Briggs was educated at Trinity College Dublin where he graduated with a Bachelor of Arts degree in Geology in 1972. He went on to the University of Cambridge to work under British palaeontologist Harry Blackmore Whittington. He was awarded a PhD in 1976 on Arthropods from the Burgess Shale, Middle Cambrian, Canada.

== Career ==
Briggs taught at Goldsmiths, University of London for 8 years, followed by 17 years at Bristol University, before moving to Yale in 2003.

Derek Briggs is best known for his research on the preservation and evolutionary significance of exceptionally preserved fossil biotas known as Konservat-Lagerstätten. His work involves a range of approaches from experimental work on the factors controlling decay and fossilisation, through studies of early diagenetic mineralisation and organic preservation, to field work on a range of fossil occurrences. While at the University of Cambridge, Briggs worked on the fossils of the Middle Cambrian Burgess Shale of British Columbia alongside a fellow student Simon Conway Morris, both under the supervision of Harry Whittington. The Burgess Shale project subsequently became one of the most celebrated endeavours in the field of palaeontology in the latter half of the 20th century. Briggs's work on the Cambrian radiation led to the first analysis of the relationships and morphological evolution of early arthropods, and the reconstruction of the giant predatory Anomalocaris from the Burgess Shale. He has used analyses of specimens and laboratory experiments to determine how soft tissues are fossilized through replication by minerals such as apatite and pyrite, and how organic tissues are preserved. He was the first to demonstrate that soft-tissues can be extensively replicated by authigenic minerals in the laboratory. He has played a major role in investigations of a number of Lagerstätten in addition to the Burgess Shale, including Fezouata, Winneshiek, Beecher’s Bed, Herefordshire, and Hunsrück. He has contributed to discoveries on fossil groups of different ages ranging from the nature and vertebrate affinities of conodonts to the colour of dinosaur plumage.

Honors include Fellow of the Royal Society, Honorary Member of the Royal Irish Academy, and Member of the American Academy of Arts and Sciences. He has been awarded the Lyell Medal of the Geological Society of London, the Boyle Medal of the Royal Dublin Society, the Paleontological Society Medal, the Lapworth Medal of the Palaeontological Association, and the Seilacher Medal of the Göttingen Academy of Sciences and Humanities.

== Books ==
- Allen, K.C. and Briggs, D.E.G. (eds) 1989 Evolution and the fossil record, xiii + 265pp. Belhaven Press, London. ISBN 978-1-85293-011-0
- Briggs, D.E.G. and Crowther, P.R. (eds) 1990 Palaeobiology - a synthesis, xiii + 583 pp. Blackwell Scientific Publications, Oxford. ISBN 978-0-632-02525-1
- Allison, P.A. and Briggs, D.E.G. (eds) 1991 Taphonomy: releasing the data locked in the fossil record, xiv + 560 pp. Plenum Press, New York. ISBN 978-0-306-43876-9
- Briggs, D.E.G., Erwin, D.H. and Collier, F.J. 1994 The fossils of the Burgess Shale, xvii + 238 pp. Smithsonian Institution Press, Washington and London. ISBN 978-1-56098-364-4
- Bartels, C., Briggs, D.E.G. and Brassel, G. 1998 Fossils of the Hunsrück Slate - marine life in the Devonian, xiv + 309 pp. Cambridge University Press. ISBN 978-0-521-44190-2
- Briggs, D.E.G. and Crowther, P.R. (eds) 2001 Palaeobiology II, xv + 583 pp. Blackwell Science, Oxford. ISBN 978-0-632-05147-2
- Barton, N.H., Briggs, D.E.G., Eisen, J.A., Goldstein, D. and Patel, N.H. 2007 Evolution, xiv + 833 pp. Cold Spring Harbor Laboratory Press. ISBN 978-0-87969-684-9
- Kühl, G., Bartels, C., Briggs, D.E.G. and Rust, J. 2011 Fossilien im Hunsrückschiefer: Einzigartige Fossilien aus einer einzigartigen Region, 120 pp. Quelle and Meyer Verlag, Wiebelsheim. ISBN 978-3-494-01483-8
- Kühl, G., Bartels, C., Briggs, D.E.G. and Rust, J. 2012 Visions of a Vanished World: The Extraordinary Fossils of the Hunsrück Slate. 128 pp. Yale University Press, New Haven and London. ISBN 978-0-300-18460-0

== Selected Papers ==
- Briggs, D.E.G., Clarkson, E.N.K. and Aldridge, R.J. 1983 The conodont animal. Lethaia 16, 1-14. https://doi.org/10.1111/j.1502-3931.1983.tb01993.x
- Whittington, H.B. and Briggs, D.E.G. 1985 The largest Cambrian animal, Anomalocaris, Burgess Shale, British Columbia. Philosophical Transactions of the Royal Society, London B309, 569-609. https://doi.org/10.1098/rstb.1985.0096
- Briggs, D.E.G. and Fortey, R.A. 1989 The early radiation and relationships of the major arthropod groups. Science, 246, 241-243. https://doi.org/10.1126/science.246.4927.241
- Briggs, D.E.G. and Kear, A.J. 1993 Fossilization of soft-tissue in the laboratory. Science 259, 1439-1442. https://doi.org/10.1126/science.259.5100.1439
- Wills, M.A., Briggs, D.E.G. and Fortey, R.A. 1994 Disparity as an evolutionary index: a comparison of Cambrian and Recent arthropods. Paleobiology 20, 93-130. https://doi.org/10.1017/S009483730001263X
- Orr, P.J., Briggs, D.E.G. and Kearns, S.L. 1998 Cambrian Burgess Shale animals replicated in clay minerals. Science 281, 1173-1175. https://doi.org/10.1126/science.281.5380.1173
- Briggs, D.E.G. 2003 The role of decay and mineralization in the preservation of soft-bodied fossils. Annual Review of Earth and Planetary Sciences 31, 275-301. https://doi.org/10.1146/annurev.earth.31.100901.144746
- Martínez-Delclòs, X., Briggs, D.E.G. and Peñalver, E. 2004 Taphonomy of insects in carbonates and amber. Palaeogeography, Palaeoclimatology, Palaeoecology 203, 19-64. https://doi.org/10.1016/S0031-0182(03)00643-6
- Vinther, J., Briggs, D.E.G., Prum, R.O. and Saranathan, V. 2008 The colour of fossil feathers. Biology Letters 4, 522-525. https://doi.org/10.1098/rsbl.2008.0302
- Farrell, Ú.C., Martin, M.J., Hagadorn, J.W., Whiteley, T. and Briggs, D.E.G. 2009 Beyond Beecher’s Trilobite Bed: Widespread pyritization of soft-tissues in the Late Ordovician Taconic Foreland Basin. Geology 37, 907-910. https://doi: 10.1130/G30177A.1
- Van Roy, P., Orr, P.J., Botting, J.P., Muir, L.A., Vinther, J., Lefebvre, B., el Hariri, K. and Briggs, D.E.G. 2010 Ordovician faunas of Burgess Shale type. Nature 465, 215-218. https://doi.org/10.1038/nature09038
- Li, Q.-G., Gao, K.-Q., Vinther, J., Shawkey, M.D., Clarke, J.A., D’Alba, L., Meng, Q.-J., Briggs, D.E.G. and Prum, R.O. 2010 Plumage color patterns of an extinct dinosaur. Science 327, 1369-1372. https://doi.org/10.1126/science.1186290
- Briggs, D.E.G. and Summons, R.E. 2014 Ancient biomolecules: their origin, fossilization and significance in revealing the history of life. Bioessays 36, 482-490. https://doi.org/10.1002/bies.201400010
- Briggs, D.E.G., Liu, H., McKay, R.M. and Witzke, B.J. 2018 The Winneshiek biota; exceptionally well-preserved fossils in a Middle Ordovician impact crater. Journal of the Geological Society, London 175, 865-874. https://doi.org/10.1144/jgs2018-101
- Siveter, D.J., Briggs, D.E.G., Siveter, D.J. and Sutton, M.D. 2020 The Herefordshire Lagerstätte: fleshing out Silurian marine life. Journal of the Geological Society, London 177, 1-13. https://doi.org/10.1144/jgs2019-110
- Wiemann, J., Menéndez, I., Crawford, J.M., Fabbri, M., Gauthier, J.A., Hull, P.M., Norell, M.A. and Briggs, D.E.G. 2022 Fossil biomolecules reveal an avian metabolism in the ancestral dinosaur. Nature 606, 522-526. https://doi.org/10.1038/s41586-022-04770-6
- Anderson, R.P., Woltz, C.R., Tosca, N.J., Porter, S.M. and Briggs, D.E.G. 2023 The importance of fossilisation to our reading of animal antiquity. Trends in Ecology and Evolution 38, 1060-1071. https://doi.org/10.1016/j.tree.2023.05.014

== Honors ==
- 1999 Fellow of the Royal Society.
- 2000 Premio Capo d'Orlando.
- 2000 Lyell Medal, Geological Society of London.
- 2001 Boyle Medal, Royal Dublin Society/Irish Times.
- 2003 Honorary Member of the Royal Irish Academy.
- 2009 Bownocker Medal, School of Earth Sciences, Ohio State University.
- 2010 Sc.D. (honorary doctorate), Trinity College, University of Dublin.
- 2015 Paleontological Society Medal.
- 2019 Member American Academy of Arts and Sciences.
- 2019 Lapworth Medal, Palaeontological Association.
- 2025 Seilacher Medal, Göttingen Academy of Sciences and Humanities in Lower Saxony.
