= Harry B. Whittington =

British palaeontologist (1916–2020)

- Born: Harry Blackmore Whittington; 24 March 1916; Birmingham, England
- Died: 20 June 2010 (aged 94); Cambridge, England
- Education: University of Birmingham (BSc, PhD)
- Known for: Fossils of the Burgess Shale; Cambrian Explosion
- Spouse: Dorothy Arnold (m. 1940; died 1997)
- Awards: Bigsby Medal (1957); Fellow of the Royal Society (1971); Paleontological Society Medal (1983); Lyell Medal (1986); Mary Clark Thompson Medal (1990); Lapworth Medal (2000); International Prize for Biology (2001); Wollaston Medal (2001)
- Scientific career
- Fields: Paleontology
- Workplaces: University of Cambridge; University of Rangoon; Yale University; Jinling Women's University; Harvard University; Museum of Comparative Zoology
- Doctoral advisor: Frederick William Shotton
- Other academic advisors: Leonard Johnston Wills
- Notable students: Frank H. T. Rhodes; Richard A. Fortey; Derek Briggs; Simon Conway Morris

Harry Blackmore Whittington FRS (24 March 1916 – 20 June 2010) was a British palaeontologist who made a major contribution to the study of fossils of the Burgess Shale and other Cambrian fauna. His works are largely responsible for the concept of Cambrian explosion, whereby modern animal body plans are explained to originate during a short span of geological period. With initial work on trilobites, his discoveries revealed that these arthropods were the most diversified of all invertebrates during the Cambrian Period. He was responsible for setting the standard for naming and describing the delicate fossils preserved in Konservat-Lagerstätten.

After completing his PhD from the University of Birmingham, Whittington spent much of his career out of Britain. He started his professional career at the University of Rangoon, Burma. Then he moved to China to teach at Ginling Women's College. After the end of World War II, he moved to Harvard University to become Professor of Palaeontology, and simultaneously Curator of Invertebrate Palaeontology at the Museum of Comparative Zoology. It was during this period that he began his major works in palaeontological research. Towards the last part of his career, he returned to England as Woodwardian Chair in Geology at the Department of Earth Sciences, University of Cambridge and was affiliated to Sidney Sussex College.

== Biography ==
=== Early life and education ===
Whittington was born at the height of World War I in Handsworth, now the inner part of Birmingham City. His father, Harry, a gunsmith, died of influenza in 1918 when he was barely two years of age. He was the younger of two children; his sister was Edith Mary (1912–1993). He inherited his middle name from his mother, Edith Mabel Blackmore (1888–1973), and was commonly referred to as "Harry B." by his later school friends. The family lived with his maternal grandparents, William and Fanny Blackmore. The entire family was devoted Methodists so that church was an important aspect in their lives.

He was a regular churchgoer at Lozells Street Methodist Mission, to which his grandfather was one of the founders, till he completed his education in Birmingham. He never lost his religious commitment throughout life. His mother encouraged him on education rather than in the family tradition of metal works. His uncle, Ernest Blackmore, had a master's degree in engineering from the University of Birmingham, and inspired him to take up science. Whittington was educated at Road Infant School, then Grove Lane School, and finally Handsworth Grammar School for his early education.

He was a naturally gifted athlete, very good in cricket, swimming, and football. In 1933, his academic performance earned him a three-year Birmingham University bursary. He graduated with a BSc in first-class honours in 1936. His first geology teacher Professor Leonard J. Wills proved a most valuable mentor in his scientific career. Immediately after graduation, Wills found for Whittington a research studentship newly introduced by the university. With this, Whittington was enrolled in PhD to investigate the palaeontology of Berwyn Hills in North Wales, under the supervision of Professor Frederick William Shotton.

He mainly focussed on trilobites. His first technical publications appeared in 1938 in the Quarterly Journal of the Geological Society of London, and in the Annals and Magazine of Natural History. He received his doctorate in 1937. Wills again helped him to obtain a Commonwealth fund fellowship to study under Carl O. Dunbar at Yale University in New Haven, Connecticut, during 1938 to 1940. His important moments in America were that he befriended G. Arthur Cooper, an Assistant Curator at Division of Stratigraphic Paleontology in United States National Museum, who remained his lifelong friend; and Dorothy Emma Arnold, a docent in the School Service Department of the Peabody Museum in Yale, who became his lifelong wife. But his time in Yale was interrupted by World War II.

=== Professional career ===
Having no keen interest in joining the war or returning to England, Whittington accepted a job offered by the American Baptist Mission Society of New York City to work in a Christian-run Judson College (which was a part, and later forerunner of, the University of Rangoon) in Burma. With his newly wedded wife, he headed for Rangoon in August 1940. His teaching job was cut short by the aftermath of the battle of Pearl Harbor in December 1941, as the college was forced to close.

With his wife, he volunteered to work in a medical unit headquartered in China. While staying in Chengdu on their mission in January 1942, he was invited to a teaching faculty at Ginling Women's College. The college was one of the refugee colleges from east China affiliated with West China Union University, and was supported by the American Baptist Mission. By the end of the war in 1945, he had become Professor. In August, an invitation arrived from the University of Birmingham to join as a lecturer (which was initiated by Wills). He arrived in Birmingham in October just in time to start his course.

He immediately set to work on trilobites particularly from North America. He had taken a research student Frank H. T. Rhodes (who later became the ninth President of Cornell University). In 1949 he received another invitation, this time from Harvard University, to succeed Preston E. Cloud, to hold the posts of Associate Professor in the Department of Geology, and Curator of Invertebrate Paleontology in the Museum of Comparative Zoology.

After 17 years of serving in America, in 1966 he received yet another invitation from the University of Cambridge, to become the Woodwardian Professor of Geology, which is by far the oldest chair in geology in Britain. In the Autumn he was in Cambridge, with a joint appointment as Professorial Fellow in Sidney Sussex College. In 1983, at age 67, he retired from his posts.

=== Personal life and death ===
Whittington, as was his family, remained a Christian his entire life, belonging to the Methodist Church. His first professional careers were directly due to his religious connections. Judson College in Burma and Ginling Women's College in China were Christian, specifically Methodist-supported institutions.

During his post-doctoral research in Yale, he met Dorothy Emma Arnold (24 October 1904 – 27 August 1997). They were married on 10 August 1940 in Washington DC. They had no children. But they cared much for Whittington's sister's children and Dorothy's younger sisters. Dorothy had poor health, particularly in her latter days, and became almost blind, just before her death.

By contrast, Whittington was remarkable for his good health, but eventually age took its toll. In 2010 he became physically weak, suffering from several problems, including pneumonia, and died in Cambridge Hospital at 94 years of age. His funeral was held on 16 July at St Mary and St Michael Church in Trumpington.

== Awards and honours ==
- Fellow of the Royal Society
- 1990 Mary Clark Thompson Medal from the National Academy of Sciences.
- 2000 Lapworth Medal of the Palaeontological Association
- 2001 International Prize for Biology
- 2001 Wollaston Medal

== Legacy ==
Whittington is immortalised in palaeontology by fossil names given after his, such as:

- Arthropods: Whittingtonia Prantl & Přibyl, 1949; Whittingtonia whittingtoni Kielan, 1960; Ceraurus whittingtoni Evitt, 1953; Ectenonotus whittingtoni Ross, 1967; Hibbertia whittingtoni Tripp, 1965; Basilicus (Basiliella) whittingtoni Shaw, 1968; Paraharpes whittingtoni McNamara 1979; Harrycaris whittingtoni Briggs & Rolfe, 1983; Pseudarthron whittingtoni Selden & White, 1983; Acidiphorus whittingtoni Brett & Westrop, 1996; Pamdelurion whittingtoni Budd, 1997; Acmarhachis whittingtoni Westrop & Eoff, 2012; Mirrabooka harryi Holloway & Lane, 2012
- Brachiopod: Eostropheodonta whittingtoni Bancroft, 1949
- Nautiloid: Aethiosolen whittingtoni Flower, 1966 (Whittington himself used to call the specimens as "gas pipes" for their straight tubulular structure, so that the binomial is meant for "Whittington’s gas pipe" by Rousseau H. Flower)

== Books ==
- Whittington, Harry B. (1985). The Burgess Shale. New Haven: Yale University Press. ISBN 978-0-300033489.
- Whittington, H.B. (1992). Trilobites. Woodbridge, Suffolk, UK: Boydell Press. ISBN 978-0-851153117.

Academic offices
Preceded by Oliver Bulman	Woodwardian Professor of Geology, University of Cambridge; 1966-1983	Succeeded by Nick McCave
