= Contingency (evolutionary biology) =

Effect of evolutionary history on outcomes

In evolutionary biology, contingency describes how the outcome of evolution may be affected by the history of a particular lineage.

== Overview ==
Evolution is a historical process, and the outcomes of history can be sensitive to the details of the interactions and events that preceded them. Contingency was especially emphasized by Stephen Jay Gould, particularly in his 1989 book Wonderful Life. Gould used the thought experiment of rewinding the "tape of life" to the distant past, and argued that even small changes to history would result in evolutionary outcomes very different from our world. Gould's thought experiment has inspired real experiments in the lab and in the field, as well as study of living and extinct organisms as natural experiments.

These studies have found that repeatability in evolution is common, particularly in cases of similar founding populations, when defining repeatability broadly, and over the timescales observable in experiments. Convergent evolution has also been found to be unexpectedly widespread in nature, though it occurs more often among closely related taxa that share more genes and developmental biases, indicating that contingency and convergence may both play a role. Additionally, a trait may be convergent at a broader level of description while being divergent at a more detailed level, with an example being the differently structured wings of insects, pterosaurs, birds, and bats. Knowing how common convergence is also requires more research into how often a trait failed to evolve under the same selective pressures, as well as into traits that evolved only once among all known organisms.

Some examples of contingency affecting evolutionary outcomes have been identified. In the E. coli long-term evolution experiment, out of the 12 populations, only one evolved the highly beneficial trait of growing on citrate, which further experimental replays using frozen ancestral bacteria showed required particular 'potentiating' mutations to arise first. Woodpeckers and aye-ayes occupy the same ecological niche of locating and extracting beetle larvae from wood, but do so by very different means (beak and elongated finger respectively) due to their respective evolutionary histories, as birds lack fingers and primates lack beaks. The unique flora and fauna of isolated locations on Earth, such as New Zealand, as well as from extinct lineages such as the non-avian dinosaurs during the Mesozoic, are also examples of contingency in evolution resulting in different outcomes.

A 2025 study has suggested that the origin of eukaryotes, an evolutionary transition that occurred only once, may nevertheless have been a highly probable outcome under deep biochemical or informational constraints. It proposes that prokaryotes faced an impending "computational crisis" in their ability to explore new regions of protein sequence space, making the emergence of more complex cellular systems a likely solution rather than a contingent accident.

== In Wonderful Life ==
=== Replaying the "tape of life" ===
The central question proposed by Wonderful Life is that if life initially proliferated into a greater variety of phyla than currently exist and were subsequently decimated by the stochastic grim reaper of extinction, what then can be said about the inevitability of human intelligence and superiority? Additionally, Gould asks what role historical contingencies play in the evolution of life on Earth. It is these central ideas which prompt Gould to propose a thought experiment called "replaying the tape of life." Its central essence is this: if we rewind the clock and replay the history of life on Earth numerous times, will we consistently see the same outcome that is the reality we experience today? The outcome of this thought experiment has two possible interpretations, elaborated by Gould,

"Suppose that ten of a hundred designs will survive and diversify. If the ten survivors are predictable by superiority of anatomy (Interpretation 1), then they will win each time – and Burgess eliminations do not challenge our comforting view of life. But if the ten survivors are protégés of Lady Luck or fortunate beneficiaries of odd historical contingencies (Interpretation 2), then each replay of the tape will yield a different set of survivors and a radically different history. And if you recall from high-school algebra how to calculate permutations and combinations, you will realize that the total number of combinations for 10 items from a pool of 100 yields more than 17 trillion potential outcomes." – Stephen Jay Gould

Gould's opinion, and the central argument of Wonderful Life, is that "any replay of the tape of life would lead evolution down a pathway radically different from the road actually taken." Additionally, Gould argues, no outcome can be predicated from the start, but the resulting pattern that emerges after replaying the tape of life would be just as interpretable and logical as our current situation.

=== Evolutionary iconography ===
In Wonderful Life, Stephen Jay Gould discusses the iconography of evolution in popular culture and the damaging effects of the march of progress on public understanding of the theory.

The march of progress, Gould argues, has led to the popular interpretation that the evolution of increased mental powers, ultimately culminating in the development of man's complex brain, is the natural outcome of evolution. Thus, the term "Evolution" is often conflated with a linear progression of life towards ever-increasing mental powers and a "comfortable view of human inevitability and superiority." Gould argues that the definition of Evolution to professional biologists is "adaptation to changing environments", not progress, and that the composition of life on the planet is rather a "copiously branching bush, continually pruned by the grim reaper of extinction, not a ladder of predictable progress." He discusses society's obsession with unsuccessful lineages as "textbook cases" of "evolution". To elaborate, we consistently seek out "a single line of advance from the true topology of copious branching. In this misguided effort, we are inevitably drawn to branches so near the brink of total annihilation that they retain only one surviving twig. We then view this twig as the acme of upward achievement, rather than the probable last grasp of a richer ancestry." Gould uses the evolution of the horse to illustrate this point, as the unbroken connection between Hyracotherium (formerly called Eohippus) and Equus provides an apparent linear path from simplicity to complexity. The only reason the evolution of horses has become the canonical representation of progressive evolution is because their bush has been extremely unsuccessful. Instead, Gould argues, we should look to bats, antelopes, and rodents as champions of mammalian evolution as they present us with "thousands of twigs on a vigorous bush" and are the true embodiments of evolutionarily successful groups.

=== The cone vs the pyramid ===
Gould argues that the conventional view of evolution, as illustrated by the cone of increasing diversity, is flawed. It is typically assumed that early life is restricted in form, and from this restriction of form follows diversification into the variety of animal life that currently exists. This cone can be visualized as an inverted Christmas tree, with a narrow base and numerous branches proliferating outward into the present day. Gould presents an alternative hypothesis, however, which states that the history of life is better described as "decimation followed by diversification within a few remaining stocks", represented as a pyramid with a wide base of anatomical disparity that becomes increasingly constrained by natural selection and extinction level events as time moves forward. This is evidenced by the fact that the fossils excavated from the Burgess Shale in British Columbia represent a paleo-ecosystem with much greater anatomical disparity than currently exists and that fewer phyla exist today compared to the Cambrian seas. Gould offers the view that life during the Cambrian explosion quickly proliferated into the diversity of forms seen today due to the availability of numerous ecological niches and was subsequently decimated by extinction level events throughout geological time. He also notes that the survival of groups following extinction events bears no relationship to traditional notions of Darwinian success in normal times. For example,

"Even if fishes hone their adaptations to peaks of aquatic perfection, they will all die if the pond dries up. But grubby old buster the lungfish, former laughing stock of the piscine priesthood, may pull through – and not because a bunion on his great-grandfather's fin warned his ancestors about an impending comet. Buster and his kin may prevail because a feature evolved long ago for a different use has fortuitously permitted survival during a sudden and unpredictable change in the rules. And if we are Buster's legacy, and the result of a thousand other similarly happy accidents, how can we possibly view our mentality as inevitable, or even probable?" – Stephen Jay Gould

Ultimately, Gould explains, both the false iconography of the march of progress and our allegiance to the cone of increasing diversity have led us astray in our thinking about trends in evolutionary biology.

=== Implications in the Origin of Life and Extraterrestrial Life Detection ===
The 2024 paper "Alternative Pathways in Astrobiology" extends Gould' contingency concept to the origins of life, proposing that non-biomolecular chemistry may have played a significant role in the emergence of life on Earth. The authors argue that prebiotic environments likely contained a diverse array of non-biomolecular compounds that could have contributed to the formation of life. This challenges the traditional view that life must arise solely from biomolecules, such as proteins and nucleic acids, and suggests that life's origins may be more complex and varied.

The paper also addresses the "N = 1 problem," which refers to the limitation of basing all theories of life on a single example—life on Earth. This terrestrial bias could hinder the search for extraterrestrial life by assuming that alien life must conform to Earth-like biochemical frameworks. The authors propose a model that incorporates both deterministic and contingent processes, suggesting a spectrum of possibilities for how life could arise under different environmental conditions. This broader understanding of the origins of life, which includes both biomolecular and non-biomolecular pathways, has significant implications for astrobiology and the detection of extraterrestrial biosignatures.

== See also ==
- Speculative evolution
