= Evolution as fact and theory =

Discussion of the meaning and usage of the terms evolution, fact and theory

Many scientists and philosophers of science have described evolution as fact and theory, a phrase which was used as the title of an article by paleontologist Stephen Jay Gould in 1981. He describes fact in science as meaning data, not known with absolute certainty but "confirmed to such a degree that it would be perverse to withhold provisional assent". A scientific theory is a well-substantiated explanation of such facts. The facts of evolution come from observational evidence of current processes, from imperfections in organisms recording historical common descent, and from transitions in the fossil record. Theories of evolution provide a provisional explanation for these facts.

Each of the words evolution, fact and theory has several meanings in different contexts. In biology, evolution refers to observed changes in organisms over successive generations, to their descent from a common ancestor, and at a technical level to a change in gene frequency over time; it can also refer to explanatory theories (such as Charles Darwin's theory of natural selection) which explain the mechanisms of evolution. To a scientist, fact can describe a repeatable observation capable of great consensus; it can refer to something that is so well established that nobody in a community disagrees with it; and it can also refer to the truth or falsity of a proposition. To the public, theory can mean an opinion or conjecture (e.g., "it's only a theory"), but among scientists it has a much stronger connotation of "well-substantiated explanation". With this number of choices, people can often talk past each other, and meanings become the subject of linguistic analysis.

Evidence for evolution continues to be accumulated and tested. The scientific literature includes statements by evolutionary biologists and philosophers of science demonstrating some of the different perspectives on evolution as fact and theory.

== Evolution, fact and theory ==
Evolution has been described as "fact and theory"; "fact, not theory"; "only a theory, not a fact"; "multiple theories, not fact"; and "neither fact, nor theory." The disagreements among these statements, however, have more to do with the meaning of words than the substantial issues and this controversy is discussed below.

=== Evolution ===
Life timeline
← / Earth formed; ← / Earliest water; ← / LUCA; ← / Earliest fossils; ← / Atmospheric oxygen; ← / Sexual reproduction; ← / Earliest fungi; ← / Neoproterozoic oxygenation event; ← / Ediacaran biota; ← / Cambrian explosion; ← / Earliest tetrapods; ← / Earliest hominoid
(million years ago)

Professor of biology Jerry Coyne sums up biological evolution succinctly:

Life on Earth evolved gradually beginning with one primitive species – perhaps a self-replicating molecule – that lived more than 3.5 billion years ago; it then branched out over time, throwing off many new and diverse species; and the mechanism for most (but not all) of evolutionary change is natural selection.

This shows the breadth and scope of the issue, incorporating the scientific fields of zoology, botany, genetics, geology, and paleontology, among many others.

But the central core of evolution is generally defined as changes in trait or gene frequency in a population of organisms from one generation to the next. This has been dubbed the standard genetic definition of evolution. Natural selection is only one of several mechanisms in the theory of evolutionary change that explains how organisms historically adapt to changing environments. The principles of heredity were re-discovered in 1900, after Darwin's death, in Gregor Mendel's research on the inheritance of simple trait variations in peas. Subsequent work into genetics, mutation, paleontology, and developmental biology expanded the applicability and scope of Darwin's original theory.

According to Douglas J. Futuyma:

Biological evolution may be slight or substantial; it embraces everything from slight changes in the proportion of different alleles within a population (such as those determining blood types) to the successive alterations that led from the earliest proto-organism to snails, bees, giraffes, and dandelions.

The word evolution in a broad sense refers to processes of change, from stellar evolution to changes in language. In biology, the meaning is more specific: heritable changes which accumulate over generations of a population. Individual organisms do not evolve in their lifetimes, but variations in the genes they inherit can become more or less common in the population of organisms. Any changes during the lifetime of organisms which are not inherited by their offspring are not part of biological evolution.

To Keith Stewart Thomson, the word evolution has at least three distinct meanings:

1. The general sense of change over time.
2. All life forms have descended with modifications from ancestors in a process of common descent.
3. The cause or mechanisms of these process of change, that are examined and explained by evolutionary theories.

Thomson remarks: "Change over time is a fact, and descent from common ancestors is based on such unassailable logic that we act as though it is a fact. Natural selection provides the outline of an explanatory theory."

Biologists consider it to be a scientific fact that evolution has occurred in that modern organisms differ from past forms, and evolution is still occurring with discernible differences between organisms and their descendants. There is such strong quantitative support for the second that scientists regard common descent as being as factual as the understanding that in the Solar System the Earth orbits the Sun, although the examination of the fundamentals of these processes is still in progress. There are several theories about the mechanisms of evolution, and there are still active debates about specific mechanisms.

There is a fourth meaning for the word evolution that is not used by biologists today. In 1857, the philosopher Herbert Spencer defined it as "change from the homogeneous to the heterogeneous." He claimed (before Darwin) that this was "settled beyond dispute" for organic evolution and applied it to the evolution of star systems, geology and human society. Even Spencer by 1865 was admitting that his definition was imperfect, but it remained popular throughout the nineteenth century before declining under the criticisms of William James and others.

=== Fact ===
The word fact is often used by scientists to refer to experimental or empirical data or objective verifiable observations. Fact is also used in a wider sense to mean any theory for which there is overwhelming evidence. According to Douglas J. Futuyma,

A fact is a hypothesis that is so firmly supported by evidence that we assume it is true, and act as if it were true.

In the sense that evolution is overwhelmingly validated by the evidence, it is a fact. It is frequently said to be a fact in the same way as the Earth's revolution around the Sun is a fact. The following quotation from Hermann Joseph Muller's article, "One Hundred Years Without Darwinism Are Enough", explains the point.

There is no sharp line between speculation, hypothesis, theory, principle, and fact, but only a difference along a sliding scale, in the degree of probability of the idea. When we say a thing is a fact, then, we only mean that its probability is an extremely high one: so high that we are not bothered by doubt about it and are ready to act accordingly. Now in this use of the term fact, the only proper one, evolution is a fact.

The National Academy of Sciences (U.S.) makes a similar point:

Scientists most often use the word "fact" to describe an observation. But scientists can also use fact to mean something that has been tested or observed so many times that there is no longer a compelling reason to keep testing or looking for examples. The occurrence of evolution in this sense is a fact. Scientists no longer question whether descent with modification occurred because the evidence supporting the idea is so strong.

Stephen Jay Gould also points out that "Darwin continually emphasized the difference between his two great and separate accomplishments: establishing the fact of evolution, and proposing a theory – natural selection – to explain the mechanism of evolution." These two aspects are frequently confused. Scientists continue to argue about particular explanations or mechanisms at work in specific instances of evolution – but the fact that evolution has occurred, and is still occurring, is undisputed.

A common misconception is that evolution cannot be reliably observed because it all happened millions of years ago and the science therefore is not dependent on facts (in the initial sense above). However, both Darwin and Alfred Russel Wallace, the co-founders of the theory, and all subsequent biologists depend primarily on observations of living organisms; Darwin concentrated largely on the breeding of domesticated animals whereas Wallace started from the biogeographical distribution of species in the Amazon and Malay Archipelago. In the early twentieth century, population genetics had centre stage, and more recently DNA has become the main focus of observation and experimentation.

Philosophers of science argue that we do not know mind-independent empirical truths with absolute certainty: even direct observations may be "theory laden" and depend on assumptions about our senses and the measuring instruments used. In this sense all facts are provisional.

=== Theory ===
The scientific definition of the word theory is different from the definition of the word in colloquial use. In the vernacular, theory can refer to guesswork, a simple conjecture, an opinion, or a speculation that does not have to be based on facts and need not be framed for making testable predictions.

In science, however, the meaning of theory is more rigorous. A scientific theory is "a well-substantiated explanation of some aspect of the natural world that can incorporate facts, laws, inferences, and tested hypotheses." Theories are formed from hypotheses that have been subjected repeatedly to tests of evidence which attempt to disprove or falsify them. In the case of evolution through natural selection, Darwin conceived the hypothesis c. 1839, and made a first draft of the concept three years later in 1842. He discussed this widely with many of his intellectual companions, and conducted further research in the background to his other writings and work. After years of development, he finally published his evidence and theory in On the Origin of Species in 1859.

Similar to the term "theory of evolution", the word "theory" is also evident in the names given for other scientific theories, as in "atom theory", "germ theory of diseases" or "cell theory". The "theory of evolution" is actually a network of theories that created the research program of biology.

Specifically Darwin, for example, proposed five separate theories in his original formulation, which included mechanistic explanations for:

1. populations changing over generations
2. gradual change
3. speciation
4. natural selection
5. common descent

Since Darwin, evolution has become a well-supported body of interconnected statements that explains numerous empirical observations in the natural world. Evolutionary theories continue to generate testable predictions and explanations about living and fossilized organisms.

Phylogenetic theory is an example of evolutionary theory. It is based on the evolutionary premise of an ancestral descendant sequence of genes, populations, or species. Individuals that evolve are linked together through historical and genealogical ties. Evolutionary trees are hypotheses that are inferred through the practice of phylogenetic theory. They depict relations among individuals that can speciate and diverge from one another. The evolutionary process of speciation creates groups that are linked by a common ancestor and all its descendants. Species inherit traits, which are then passed on to descendants. Evolutionary biologists use systematic methods and test phylogenetic theory to observe and explain changes in and among species over time. These methods include the collection, measurement, observation, and mapping of traits onto evolutionary trees. Phylogenetic theory is used to test the independent distributions of traits and their various forms to provide explanations of observed patterns in relation to their evolutionary history and biology. The neutral theory of molecular evolution is used to study evolution as a null model against which tests for natural selection can be applied.

== Evolution as theory and fact in the literature ==
The following sections provide specific quotable references from evolutionary biologists and philosophers of science demonstrating some of the different perspectives on evolution as fact and theory.

=== Evolution as fact ===
- American zoologist and paleontologist George Gaylord Simpson stated that "Darwin ... finally and definitely established evolution as a fact."
- Hermann Joseph Muller wrote, "So enormous, ramifying, and consistent has the evidence for evolution become that if anyone could now disprove it, I should have my conception of the orderliness of the universe so shaken as to lead me to doubt even my own existence. If you like, then, I will grant you that in an absolute sense evolution is not a fact, or rather, that it is no more a fact than that you are hearing or reading these words."
- Kenneth R. Miller writes, "evolution is as much a fact as anything we know in science."
- Ernst Mayr observed, "The basic theory of evolution has been confirmed so completely that most modern biologists consider evolution simply a fact. How else except by the word evolution can we designate the sequence of faunas and floras in precisely dated geological strata? And evolutionary change is also simply a fact owing to the changes in the content of gene pools from generation to generation."

=== Evolution as fact and theory ===
Fact is commonly used to refer to the observable changes in organisms' traits over generations while the word theory is reserved for the mechanisms that cause these changes:

- Writing in 1930, biologist Julian Huxley entitled the third book of the wide-ranging series The Science of Life, which dealt with the fossil record and the evidence of plant and animal structures, The Incontrovertible Fact of Evolution. He also says "Natural Selection ... is not a theory, but a fact. But does it ... suffice to account for the whole spectacle of Evolution? ... There we come to speculative matter, to theories." But he concludes that "the broad positions of Darwinism re-emerge from a scrutiny of the most exacting sort essentially unchanged." In 1932, a portion of the book was republished under the title Evolution, Fact and Theory.
- Stephen Jay Gould writes, "... evolution is a theory. It is also a fact. And facts and theories are different things, not rungs in a hierarchy of increasing certainty. Facts are the world's data. Theories are structures of ideas that explain and interpret facts. Facts do not go away when scientists debate rival theories to explain them. Einstein's theory of gravitation replaced Newton's, but apples did not suspend themselves in mid-air, pending the outcome. And humans evolved from apelike ancestors whether they did so by Darwin's proposed mechanism or by some other, yet to be discovered."
- Similarly, biologist Richard Lenski says, "Scientific understanding requires both facts and theories that can explain those facts in a coherent manner. Evolution, in this context, is both a fact and a theory. It is an incontrovertible fact that organisms have changed, or evolved, during the history of life on Earth. And biologists have identified and investigated mechanisms that can explain the major patterns of change."
- Biologist T. Ryan Gregory notes, "biologists rarely make reference to 'the theory of evolution,' referring instead simply to 'evolution' (i.e., the fact of descent with modification) or 'evolutionary theory' (i.e., the increasingly sophisticated body of explanations for the fact of evolution). That evolution is a theory in the proper scientific sense means that there is both a fact of evolution to be explained and a well-supported mechanistic framework to account for it."

=== Evolution as fact and not theory ===
Other commentators – focusing on the changes in species over generations and in some cases common ancestry – have stressed, in order to emphasize the weight of supporting evidence, that evolution is a fact, arguing that the use of the term "theory" is not useful:

- Richard Lewontin wrote, "It is time for students of the evolutionary process, especially those who have been misquoted and used by the creationists, to state clearly that evolution is fact, not theory."
- Douglas J. Futuyma writes in Evolutionary Biology (1998), "The statement that organisms have descended with modifications from common ancestors – the historical reality of evolution – is not a theory. It is a fact, as fully as the fact of the earth's revolution about the sun."
- Richard Dawkins says, "One thing all real scientists agree upon is the fact of evolution itself. It is a fact that we are cousins of gorillas, kangaroos, starfish, and bacteria. Evolution is as much a fact as the heat of the sun. It is not a theory, and for pity's sake, let's stop confusing the philosophically naive by calling it so. Evolution is a fact."
- Neil Campbell wrote in his 1990 biology textbook, "Today, nearly all biologists acknowledge that evolution is a fact. The term theory is no longer appropriate except when referring to the various models that attempt to explain how life evolves ... it is important to understand that the current questions about how life evolves in no way implies any disagreement over the fact of evolution."

=== Evolution as a collection of theories, not fact ===
The curator at the Natural History Museum of Los Angeles County, Kirk J. Fitzhugh writes that scientists must be cautious to "carefully and correctly" describe the nature of scientific investigation at a time when evolutionary biology is under attack from creationists and proponents of intelligent design. Fitzhugh writes that while facts are states of being in nature, theories represent efforts to connect those states of being by causal relationships:

"Evolution" cannot be both a theory and a fact. Theories are concepts stating cause–effect relations. Regardless of one's certainty as to the utility of a theory to provide understanding, it would be epistemically incorrect to assert any theory as also being a fact, given that theories are not objects to be discerned by their state of being.

Fitzhugh recognizes that the "theory" versus "fact" debate is one of semantics. He nevertheless contends that referring to evolution as a "fact" is technically incorrect and distracts from the primary "goal of science, which is to continually acquire causal understanding through the critical evaluation of our theories and hypotheses." Fitzhugh concludes that the "certainty" of evolution "provides no basis for elevating any evolutionary theory or hypothesis to the level of fact."

Dr William C. Robertson writing for National Science Teachers Association writes, "I have heard too many scientists claim that evolution is a fact, often in retort to the claim that it is just a theory. Evolution isn't a fact. Rather than claiming so, I think scientists would be better served to agree that evolution is a theory and then proceed to explain what a theory is – a coherent explanation that undergoes constant testing and often revision over a period of time."

== Related concepts and terminology ==
The main purpose of evolutionary biology is to provide a rational explanation for the extraordinarily complex and intricate organization of living things. To explain means to identify a mechanism that causes evolution and to demonstrate the consequences of its operation. These consequences are then the general laws of evolution, of which any given system or organism is a particular outcome.

— Graham Bell, Selection: The Mechanism of Evolution (2008)
- "Proof" of a theory has different meanings in science. Proof exists in formal sciences, such as a mathematical proof where symbolic expressions can represent precise arguments and scientific laws having precise definitions of the terms and outcomes . Proof has other meanings as it descends from its Latin roots (provable, probable, probare L.) meaning 'to test'. In this sense a proof is an inference to the best or most parsimonious explanation through a publicly verifiable demonstration (a test) of the factual (i.e., observed) and causal evidence from carefully controlled experiments. Stephen Jay Gould argued that Darwin's research, for example, pointed to the coordination of so many pieces of evidence that no other configuration other than his theory could offer a conceivable causal explanation of the facts. In this way natural selection and common ancestry has been proven. "The classical proof is the improvement of crops and livestock through artificial selection." Natural selection and other evolutionary theories are also represented in various mathematical proofs, such as the Price equation. To remain consistent with the philosophy of science, however, advancement of theory is only achieved through disproofs of hypotheses.
- "Models" are part of the scientific or inferential "tool-kit" that are constructed out of preexistent theory. Model-based science uses idealized structures or mathematical expressions to strategically create simpler representations of complex worldly systems. Models are designed to resemble the relevant aspects of hypothetical relations in the target systems under investigation.
- "Validation" is a demonstration that a model within its domain of applicability possesses a satisfactory range of accuracy consistent with the intended application of the model." Models are used in simulation research. For example, evolutionary phylogeneticists run simulations to model the tree like branching process of lineages over time. In turn, this is used to understand the theory of phylogenetics and the methods used to test for relations among genes, species, or other evolutionary units.

== See also ==
- Abiogenesis
- Epistemology
- Evidence of common descent
- Evolution (in List of common misconceptions)
- Status as a theory (in Objections to evolution)
- Theory vs. Fact (in Creation–evolution controversy)

== Bibliography ==
- Bell, Graham (2008). Selection: The Mechanism of Evolution (2nd ed.). Oxford; New York: Oxford University Press. ISBN 978-0-19-856972-5. LCCN 2007039692. OCLC 170034792.
- Campbell, Neil A. (1990). Biology (2nd ed.). Redwood City, CA: Benjamin Cummings. ISBN 978-0-8053-1800-5. LCCN 89017952. OCLC 20352649.
- Coyne, Jerry A. (2009). Why Evolution is True. New York: Viking. ISBN 978-0-670-02053-9. LCCN 2008033973. OCLC 233549529.
- Futuyma, Douglas J. (1998). Evolutionary Biology (3rd ed.). Sunderland, MA: Sinauer Associates. ISBN 978-0-87893-189-7. LCCN 97037947. OCLC 37560100.
- Gould, Stephen Jay (1994) [Originally published 1983]. "Evolution as Fact and Theory". Hen's Teeth and Horse's Toes: Further Reflections in Natural History (Reissue ed.). New York: W. W. Norton & Company. ISBN 978-0-393-31103-7. LCCN 82022259. OCLC 785709315.
  - —— (May 1981). "Evolution as Fact and Theory". Discover. 2 (5): 34–37.
- Gould, Stephen Jay (2002). The Structure of Evolutionary Theory. Cambridge, MA: Belknap Press of Harvard University Press. ISBN 978-0-674-00613-3. LCCN 2001043556. OCLC 47869352.
- James, William (1911). "Herbert Spencer's Autobiography". Memories and Studies. New York: Longmans, Green & Co. LCCN 11026966. OCLC 1573711.
- Mayr, Ernst (1982). The Growth of Biological Thought: Diversity, Evolution, and Inheritance. Translation of John Ray by E. Silk. Cambridge, MA: Belknap Press. ISBN 978-0-674-36445-5. LCCN 81013204. OCLC 7875904.
- Mayr, Ernst (1988). Toward a New Philosophy of Biology: Observations of an Evolutionist. Cambridge, MA: Belknap Press of Harvard University Press. ISBN 978-0-674-89665-9. LCCN 87031892. OCLC 17108004.
- Miller, Kenneth R. (2007) [Originally published 1999; New York: Cliff Street Books]. Finding Darwin's God: A Scientist's Search for Common Ground Between God and Evolution. New York: Harper Perennial. ISBN 978-0-06-123350-0. LCCN 99016754. OCLC 813854733.
- National Academy of Sciences (1999). Science and Creationism: A View from the National Academy of Sciences (2nd ed.). Washington, D.C.: National Academy Press. ISBN 978-0-309-06406-4. LCCN 99006259. OCLC 43803228.
- Schuh, Randall T. (2000). Biological Systematics: Principles and Applications. Ithaca, NY: Cornell University Press. ISBN 978-0-8014-3675-8. LCCN 99042377. OCLC 42027466.
- Spencer, Herbert (1865). First Principles of a New System of Philosophy. New York: D. Appleton & Company. LCCN 15024188. OCLC 3015414.
- Wells, H. G.; Huxley, Julian; Wells, G. P. (1931) [Originally published 1929–1930]. The Science of Life. Garden City, NY: Doubleday, Doran & Company, Inc. LCCN 31003561. OCLC 968712.
- Wiley, Edward O.; Lieberman, Bruce S. (2011). Phylogenetics: Theory and Practice of Phylogenetic Systematics (2nd ed.). Hoboken, NJ: Wiley-Blackwell. doi:10.1002/9781118017883. ISBN 978-0-470-90596-8. LCCN 2010044283. OCLC 741259265.
- Wilson, Edward O. (1998). Consilience: The Unity of Knowledge. New York: Knopf. ISBN 978-0-679-45077-1. LCCN 97002816. OCLC 36528112.
- Wright, Sewall (1984) [Originally published 1968]. Genetic and Biometric Foundations. Evolution and the Genetics of Populations. Vol. 1. Chicago, IL: University of Chicago Press. ISBN 978-0-226-91038-3. LCCN 67025533. OCLC 246124737.
- Zetterberg, J. Peter, ed. (1983). Evolution Versus Creationism: The Public Education Controversy. Phoenix, AZ: Oryx Press. ISBN 978-0-89774-061-6. LCCN 82018795. OCLC 9393689.
