= Rocks of Ages =

1999 Book by Stephen Jay Gould

- Author: Stephen Jay Gould
- Subject: Relationship between religion and science
- Publisher: Ballantine Books
- Publication date: 1999
- Media type: Print
- Pages: 256
- ISBN: 0-345-43009-3
- OCLC: 39886951
- Dewey Decimal: 291.1/75 21
- LC Class: BL240.2 .G68 1999
- Preceded by: Leonardo's Mountain of Clams and the Diet of Worms
- Followed by: The Lying Stones of Marrakech

Rocks of Ages: Science and Religion in the Fullness of Life is a 1999 book about the relationship between science and religion by the Harvard paleontologist Stephen Jay Gould. First published by Ballantine Books, it was reprinted by Vintage Books. The book is a volume in the series The Library of Contemporary Thought.

== Summary ==
Gould addresses the conflict between secular scientists and religious believers who question or deny scientific theory when it is in discrepancy with religious teachings on the origin and nature of the natural world. Borrowing a term from the Catholic Church, Gould describes science and religion as each comprise a separate magisterium of human understanding. Science defines the natural world, and religion the moral world. If each realm is separate, then according to Gould, they are not in conflict. He calls this the principle of non-overlapping magisteria, abbreviated NOMA.

== Reception ==
The book has been reviewed extensively, and commented on by both sides of the conflict he addresses.

== See also ==
- Intelligent design
- Richard Dawkins
- Moral Landscape
