= Jane Reece =

American scientist and textbook author

- Education: Harvard University (BA); Rutgers University (MS); University of California, Berkeley (PhD)
- Occupation: Biologist
- Known for: Co-authoring Campbell Biology; Studying bacterial recombination
- Scientific career
- Fields: Biology
- Workplaces: Stanford University

Jane B. Reece is an American scientist and textbook author. Along with American biologist Neil Campbell, she wrote the widely used Campbell/Reece Biology textbooks. Following Campbell's death in 2004, she collaborated with American biologist Lisa Urry to update subsequent editions. The textbook is widely acclaimed and is used in 90 percent of AP Biology classes and 60 percent of introductory college biology courses. The textbook has been used by over 14 million students and has been translated into over 20 languages.

== Early life and education ==
Reece received an AB in Biology from Harvard University, an MS in microbiology from Rutgers University, and a PhD in bacteriology from the University of California, Berkeley. Her doctoral thesis was entitled The RecE pathway of genetic combination in Escherichia Coli (1981). Having completed her PhD, she stayed at UC Berkeley for a while as a postdoctoral researcher, before accepting tenure at Stanford University as a researcher. Her research mainly focused on genetic recombination in bacteria.

== Career ==
Reece has taught at various colleges, including Middlesex County College (New Jersey) and Queensborough Community College (New York City). She is the author or co-author of several textbooks at Benjamin Cummings, at which place she has served as an editor since she joined in 1978. Notable among her works is The World of the Cell, third edition, which she co-authored with Wayne Becker and M.F. Poesie.

In 2017, she was awarded an honorary doctorate from Uppsala University, Sweden.
