= Campbell Biology =

Biology textbook

- Title page for Biology by Neil Campbell (1987)
- Authors: Neil Campbell; Jane Reece; Lisa Urry
- Language: English
- Publisher: Benjamin Cummings
- Publication date: 1987
- Publication place: United States
- Media type: Print (Hardcover)

Campbell Biology is a biology textbook used for introductory Biology and Advanced Placement Biology courses. The textbook was initially published in 1987 by American biologist Neil Campbell, and has been used internationally by over 700,000 students in both high school and college-level classes.

== History ==
The first edition of the textbook was published in 1987 by Benjamin Cummings, an imprint of Pearson Education. Over time, the textbook was substantially revised and updated. American biologists Jane Reece and Lisa Urry have provided substantial pedagogical contributions, making it an internationally known biology textbook. It is used in 90 percent of AP Biology classes and 60 percent of introductory college biology courses. As of 2024, the textbook has been used by over 14 million students and has been translated into over 20 languages. The book is currently in its 13th edition.

== Contents ==
The textbook is divided into eight separate units comprising 56 chapters. The organization of the units are logical, appropriate, and easy for first-year university students to follow and help them learn the content.

- The first unit is an introductory unit that introduces the scientific method and concepts of evolution.
- The second unit focuses on the various components of the cell as well as processes such as photosynthesis and cellular respiration.
- The third unit focuses on genetics and covers topics such as Mendelian genetics, DNA replication, transcription, and translation.
- The fourth unit focuses on the mechanisms of evolution and details natural selection, the Hardy–Weinberg principle and the history of life.
- The fifth unit focuses on bacteria, archaea, protists, plants, vertebrates, and invertebrates.
- The sixth unit focuses on plant anatomy.
- The seventh unit focuses on the circulatory system, respiratory system, immune system, endocrine system, and nervous system.
- The eighth unit focuses on ecology, ecosystems, and biomes.
