= Non-overlapping magisteria =

View of science and religion

Non-overlapping magisteria (NOMA) is the view, advocated by paleontologist Stephen Jay Gould, that science and religion each represent different areas of inquiry, fact vs. values, so there is a difference between the "nets" over which they have "a legitimate magisterium, or domain of teaching authority", and the two domains do not overlap. He suggests, with examples, that "NOMA enjoys strong and fully explicit support, even from the primary cultural stereotypes of hard-line traditionalism" and that it is "a sound position of general consensus, established by long struggle among people of goodwill in both magisteria." Some have criticized the idea or suggested limitations to it, and there continues to be disagreement over where the boundaries between the two magisteria should be.

== Gould's separate magisteria ==
In a 1997 essay "Non-overlapping Magisteria" for Natural History magazine, and later in his book Rocks of Ages (1999), Gould put forward what he described as "a blessedly simple and entirely conventional resolution to ... the supposed conflict between science and religion", from his puzzlement over the need and reception of the 1996 address of Pope John Paul II to the Pontifical Academy of Sciences "Truth Cannot Contradict Truth". He draws the term magisterium from Pope Pius XII's encyclical, Humani generis (1950), and defines it as "a domain where one form of teaching holds the appropriate tools for meaningful discourse and resolution", and describes the NOMA principle as "Science tries to document the factual character of the natural world, and to develop theories that coordinate and explain these facts. Religion, on the other hand, operates in the equally important, but utterly different, realm of human purposes, meanings, and values—subjects that the factual domain of science might illuminate, but can never resolve." "These two magisteria do not overlap, nor do they encompass all inquiry (consider, for example, the magisterium of art and the meaning of beauty)."

Gould emphasized the legitimacy of each field of endeavor only within its appropriate area of inquiry: "NOMA also cuts both ways. If religion can no longer dictate the nature of factual conclusions residing properly within the magisterium of science, then scientists cannot claim higher insight into moral truth from any superior knowledge of the world's empirical constitution." In the chapter "NOMA Defined and Defended" Gould gave examples of the types of questions appropriate to each area of inquiry, on the topic of "our relationship with other living creatures": "Do humans look so much like apes because we share a recent common ancestor or because creation followed a linear order, with apes representing the step just below us?" represents an inquiry concerning fact, while "Under what conditions (if ever) do we have a right to drive other species to extinction by elimination of their habitats? Do we violate any moral codes when we use genetic technology to place a gene from one creature into the genome of another species?" represent questions in the domain of values. He went on to present "an outline of historical reasons for the existence of conflict, where none should exist".

In a speech before the American Institute of Biological Sciences, Gould stressed the diplomatic reasons for adopting NOMA as well, stating that "the reason why we support that position is that it happens to be right, logically. But we should also be aware that it is very practical as well if we want to prevail." Gould argued that if indeed the polling data was correct—and that 80–90% of Americans believe in a supreme being, and such a belief is misunderstood to be at odds with evolution—then "we have to keep stressing that religion is a different matter, and science is not in any sense opposed to it", otherwise "we're not going to get very far". He did not, however, consider this diplomatic aspect to be paramount, writing in 1997: "NOMA represents a principled position on moral and intellectual grounds, not a mere diplomatic stance."

In 1997 he had elaborated on this position by describing his role as a scientist with respect to NOMA:

Religion is too important to too many people for any dismissal or denigration of the comfort still sought by many folks from theology. I may, for example, privately suspect that papal insistence on divine infusion of the soul represents a sop to our fears, a device for maintaining a belief in human superiority within an evolutionary world offering no privileged position to any creature. But I also know that souls represent a subject outside the magisterium of science. My world cannot prove or disprove such a notion, and the concept of souls cannot threaten or impact my domain. Moreover, while I cannot personally accept the Catholic view of souls, I surely honor the metaphorical value of such a concept both for grounding moral discussion and for expressing what we most value about human potentiality: our decency, care, and all the ethical and intellectual struggles that the evolution of consciousness imposed upon us.

Ciarán Benson sees a tendency to re-negotiate the borders between the "human sciences and the natural sciences", as in Wilhelm Dilthey's 1883 claim for the distinction between Geisteswissenschaften (humanities) and Naturwissenschaften (science). The astrophysicist Arnold O. Benz proposes that the boundary between the two magisteria is in the different ways they perceive reality: objective measurements in science, participatory experience in religion. The two planes of perceptions differ, but meet each other, for example, in amazement and in ethics.

== National Academy of Sciences ==
Also in 1999, the National Academy of Sciences adopted a similar stance. Its publication Science and Creationism stated that "Scientists, like many others, are touched with awe at the order and complexity of nature. Indeed, many scientists are deeply religious. But science and religion occupy two separate realms of human experience. Demanding that they be combined detracts from the glory of each."

== Humani generis ==
Gould wrote that he was inspired to consider non-overlapping magisteria after being driven to examine the 1950 encyclical Humani generis, in which Pope Pius XII permits Catholics to entertain the hypothesis of evolution for the human body so long as they accept the divine infusion of the soul. Gould cited the following paragraph:

The Teaching Authority of the Church does not forbid that, in conformity with the present state of human sciences and sacred theology, research and discussions, on the part of men experienced in both fields, take place with regard to the doctrine of evolution, in as far as it inquires into the origin of the human body as coming from pre-existent and living matter—for the Catholic faith obliges us to hold that souls are immediately created by God.

== Reception ==
Richard Dawkins has criticized Gould's position on the grounds that religion is not divorced from scientific matters or the material world. He writes, "it is completely unrealistic to claim, as Gould and many others do, that religion keeps itself away from science's turf, restricting itself to morals and values. A universe with a supernatural presence would be a fundamentally and qualitatively different kind of universe from one without. The difference is, inescapably, a scientific difference. Religions make existence claims, and this means scientific claims."

Dawkins also argues that a religion free of divine intervention would be far different from any existing ones, and certainly different from the Abrahamic religions. Moreover, he claims that religions would be only too happy to accept scientific claims that supported their views. For example, if DNA evidence proved that Jesus had no earthly father, Dawkins claims that the argument of non-overlapping magisteria would be quickly dropped.

The theologian Friedrich Wilhelm Graf has been sympathetic to the approach, but claims it for the theological side—Graf assumes that e.g. creationism may be interpreted as a reaction of religious communities on the Verweltanschaulichung (i.e. interpretation as a worldview) of (natural) science in social Darwinism. That said, attempts to compete with religion by natural science may generate a backlash that is detrimental to both sides.

Ciarán Benson, a secular humanist, defends the spiritual as a category against both. He assumes that while Gould claims for NOMA (non-overlapping magisteria of science, morality and religion), and Richard Dawkins for, verbally, "a brand of SM (bondage of the others by the scientific magisterium)", Benson preferred OM (overlapping magisteria), especially in the case of art and religion.

Francis Collins criticized what he saw as the limits of NOMA, arguing that science, religion, and other spheres have "partially overlapped" while agreeing with Gould that morals, spirituality and ethics cannot be determined from naturalistic interpretation. This exceeds the greatest interconnection allowed by Gould in his original 1997 essay "Nonoverlapping Magisteria" in which he writes:

Each ... subject has a legitimate magisterium, or domain of teaching authority ... This resolution might remain all neat and clean if the nonoverlapping magisteria (NOMA) of science and religion were separated by an extensive no man's land. But, in fact, the two magisteria bump right up against each other, interdigitating in wondrously complex ways along their joint border. Many of our deepest questions call upon aspects of both for different parts of a full answer—and the sorting of legitimate domains can become quite complex and difficult.

Matt Ridley notes that religion does more than talk about ultimate meanings and morals, and science is not proscribed from talking about the above either. After all, morals involve human behavior, an observable phenomenon, and science is the study of observable phenomena. Ridley notes that there is substantial scientific evidence on evolutionary origins of ethics and morality.

Sam Harris has heavily criticized this concept in his book The Moral Landscape. Harris notes that "Meaning, values, morality and the good life must relate to facts about the well-being of conscious creatures – and, in our case, must lawfully depend upon events in the world and upon states of the human brain."

== See also ==
- Fact–value distinction
- God of the gaps
- New atheism § Views on non-overlapping magisteria
- Relationship between science and religion
- Sphere sovereignty
