= Neil Campbell (scientist) =

American scientist

Neil Allison Campbell
- Born: April 17, 1946; Culver City, California
- Died: October 21, 2004 (aged 58); Redlands, California
- Education: California State University, Long Beach; University of California, Los Angeles (M.S); University of California, Riverside (Ph.D.)
- Known for: Studying desert and coastal plants
- Scientific career
- Fields: Biology
- Workplaces: Cornell University; Pomona College; University of California, Riverside; San Bernardino Valley College

Neil Allison Campbell (April 17, 1946 – October 21, 2004) was an American scientist best known for his textbook, Campbell Biology, first published in 1987. The textbook was significantly updated in subsequent editions by American biologists Jane Reece and Lisa Urry, being used by over 700,000 students in both high school and college-level classes.

== Education ==
Campbell earned his M.S. in zoology from the University of California, Los Angeles and his Ph.D. in Plant Biology from the University of California, Riverside. He taught collegiate classes for over 30 years at Cornell University, Pomona College, University of California, Riverside, and San Bernardino Valley College.

== Work ==
Campbell received multiple awards: the Distinguished Alumnus Award from University of California, Riverside in 2001 and the first ever Outstanding Professor Award from San Bernardino Valley College in 1986.

Campbell was also a researcher who studied desert and coastal plants. He conducted research on how certain plants would adjust in environments with different salinity, temperature, and pH. In addition, he conducted studies on the Mimosa plant and other legumes.

== Death ==
Campbell died on 21 October 2004 of heart failure just after the manuscript for the seventh international edition of Biology was completed. The Neil Allison Campbell Endowed Research Award was created at UC Riverside to honor his memory.
