= Dinosaur in a Haystack =

Collection of essays by Stephen Jay Gould

- Cover
- Author: Stephen Jay Gould
- Language: English
- Subject: Natural history
- Publisher: Harmony Books
- Publication date: December 12, 1995
- Publication place: United States
- Media type: Print (hardcover and paperback)
- Pages: 480
- ISBN: 0-517-70393-9
- OCLC: 33892123
- Dewey Decimal: 575 20
- LC Class: QH366.2 .G659 1995
- Preceded by: Eight Little Piggies
- Followed by: Leonardo's Mountain of Clams and the Diet of Worms

Dinosaur in a Haystack (1995) is the seventh volume of collected essays by the Harvard paleontologist Stephen Jay Gould. It collects essays culled from Gould's monthly column "The View of Life" published in Natural History magazine, which Gould contributed for 27 years. The book deals with themes familiar to Gould's writing: evolution, science biography, probabilities, and strange oddities found in nature.

His essay "Poe's Greatest Hit" analyzes the controversial conchology textbook The Conchologist's First Book (1839), edited by Edgar Allan Poe. Poe's volume on natural history sold out within two months, and was his only book republished during his lifetime. Essay "Dinomania" is a review of Michael Crichton's novel Jurassic Park and Steven Spielberg's blockbuster film of the same name.

== Reception ==
The book received favorable reviews in Publishers Weekly and The New York Times.
