= I Have Landed =

2002 literary work by Stephen Jay Gould

- Author: Stephen Jay Gould
- Language: English
- Publisher: W. W. Norton & Co.
- Publication date: May 14, 2002
- Publication place: United States
- Media type: Print
- Pages: 432
- ISBN: 0-609-60143-1
- OCLC: 49421722
- Dewey Decimal: 578 21
- LC Class: QH45.5 .G735 2002
- Preceded by: The Lying Stones of Marrakech

I Have Landed (2002) is the 10th and final volume of collected essays by the Harvard paleontologist Stephen Jay Gould. The essays were culled from his monthly column "This View of Life" in Natural History magazine, to which Gould contributed for 27 years. The book deals, in typically discursive fashion, with themes familiar to Gould's writing: evolution and its teaching, science biography, probabilities and common sense.

The series of consecutive essays began in 1974, ending in January 2001 with the title essay "I have landed." The title refers to the very first words his grandfather Papa Joe wrote as he arrived on Ellis Island, New York as a newly arrived Hungarian immigrant, September 11, 1901.

In I Have Landed, Gould examines Isabelle Duncan's writings in 1860, in which she tried to reconcile the Biblical creation story and geography. He also provides an analysis of Johann Friedrich Blumenbach's classification of humans into five races.
