= Obcell =

Hypothetical earliest form of life

Obcells are hypothetical proto-organisms or the earliest form of life. The term was first proposed by Thomas Cavalier-Smith in 2001. According to Cavalier-Smith's theory for the origin of the first cell, two cup-shaped obcells or hemicells fused to make a protocell with double-lipid layer envelope, internal genome and ribosomes, protocytosol, and periplasm.

== Hypothesis ==
The beginning of life and living organisms is difficult to specifically date as proto-organisms' earliest existence left no paleontological clues. Cavalier-Smith argues that initially there was primordial soup which contained amino acids, the building blocks for proteins. Replication and phosphorylation were not relevant until the prebiotic soup started to become organized into the "nucleic acid" era. Although still not "living," the substances during this period could replicate and undergo organized chemical processes. Based on these orderly processes, the world transitioned into an obcell world which included coding for proteins and chromosomes and the symbiotic interactions between membranes, genes, and enzymes. Obcells probably had a single membrane that was lipid-dense and also had specific cytoskeletal proteins that gave the obcells its curvature. These skeletal proteins were probably contained within the obcell's protoperiplasm.

=== Role of polyphosphate ===
Based on the high concentration of phosphate in the Earth's crust, the universal metabolism of pyrophosphate and polyP in modern cells, the ability to form phosphates abiotically, and its simplicity compared to nucleotides and nucleic acids, replication probably began on phosphate-rich mineral surfaces and involved phosphate related enzymes. Replicases are necessary for the genetic code to have existed, so Cavalier-Smith argues that "polyP kinases and pyrophosphate kinases may have been among the earliest protein-coded catalysts." If these did exist, then polyP-binding proteins would have been the most useful source of energy for the obcells. Due to its anionic properties, it is quite plausible that while immersed in the nucleotide and nucleic acid rich environment, polyP-binding proteins could have polymerized with these substances. Therefore, obcells with exonucleases attached to their membrane would have had an advantage for replication compared to those that did not. In modern cells, glucokinases typically have two different phosphate-binding domains, mainly containing the amino acids glycine, threonine, and aspartate. Therefore, Cavalier-Smith proposes that these shared domains could have originated in obcells to bind to pyrophosphate.

=== Living conditions ===
Cavalier-Smith argues that the most plausible location for obcells to survive and grow in number on Earth was by the land-water interface, not by oceanic seafloor vents. Due to their likely dependence on polyP and pyrophosphate for energy over adenosine triphosphate, obcells would likely congregate in areas where these minerals were formed in high concentrations. Polyphosphate could easily be formed by the seashore in "small salty pools, porous sediments, or protosoils." At lower temperatures, nucleic acids are more stable and shorter chain lipids can form membranes easier. Combined with their dependence on polyP and pyrophosphate, the lower temperatures at the land-water interface the most likely habitat for obcells to evolve. In these conditions, the extreme temperature changes and heterogeneity of external components could induce sharp changes in the structure and function of colonizing obcells which is more likely to lead to the evolution of protocells compared to stable temperatures and homogeneous external components.

=== Phosphorylation ===
From the obcells' dependence on polyP and pyrophosphate for energy, their metabolism did not rely on oxidative phosphorylation or photophosphorylation. These processes were too complex for the simple nature of obcells. Cavalier-Smith calls the obcells' phosphorylation of these minerals for energy "lithophosphorylation", which is simple and possible from the existence of kinases that could catalyze polyP- binding proteins and pyrophosphate-binding proteins. From this, it is likely that obcells had these kinases on their surfaces to react with these external polyP-binding and pyrophosphate proteins. Polyphosphate and pyrophosphate were possibly small enough to diffuse into obcells. Therefore, it also likely that some of these kinases were in the obcell lumen to react with these proteins and then store them for later use. This storage would be beneficial for obcells in times when the concentration of external polyP-binding proteins and pyrophosphate-binding proteins would vary.

== Replication ==
=== Division ===
Since obcells were cup-shaped and could expose their chromosomes to the harsh environment, to protect their genetic information and any signaling factors, obcells could attach to polyphosphate surfaces using local adhesin proteins. During division, division proteins would begin to pinch the obcell in half, separating the internal components between the two daughter obcells. As this pinching was occurring, the structural integrity of the membrane began to weaken and the two halves would migrate towards the polyphosphate surface. Adhesin proteins would attach these ends to the surface and division would be complete.

=== Fusion ===
Over several millions of years, obcells managed to survive off division only. Eventually, obcells evolved to fuse into proto-organisms for added protection of their internal components and the decreased probability of the loss of oligosaccharides during division. Two obcells would come in contact with each other and would adhere together by the adhesion proteins at the rims of both. This adhesion could also be firmer than on the polyphosphate surfaces without restricting division and growth. The fusions of obcells lead to the creation of cytosol, compared to obcell division. From this, the membrane began to change into a cytoplasmic side and an outer side, the preliminary double membrane of modern protocells. In order to prevent the obcells from completely fusing together, it is believed that the after the two obcells adhered together, the adhesin proteins continued to act as plugs. These points of adhesion could have allowed transport for some substances between the cytosol and environment, but these could have evolved into Bayer's patches which are breaks between the cytoplasmic side and outer side of the membrane in gram-negative bacteria.
