= Leonardo's Mountain of Clams and the Diet of Worms =

- Author: Stephen Jay Gould
- Publisher: Harmony Books
- Publication date: September 29, 1998
- Media type: Print (hardcover and paperback)
- Pages: 422
- ISBN: 0-609-60141-5
- OCLC: 38438624
- Dewey Decimal: 508 21
- LC Class: QH81 .G67323 1998
- Preceded by: Dinosaur in a Haystack
- Followed by: The Lying Stones of Marrakech

Leonardo's Mountain of Clams and the Diet of Worms (1998) is the eighth volume of collected essays by the Harvard paleontologist Stephen Jay Gould. This collection focuses on what Gould calls "humanistic natural history".

The essays were culled from his monthly column "The View of Life" in Natural History magazine, to which Gould contributed for 27 years. The book deals, in typically discursive fashion, with themes familiar to Gould's writing: evolution and its teaching, science biography, probabilities and common sense.
