= Kirk J. Fitzhugh =

American curator

- Born: 1957 (age 68–69); Dallas, Texas
- Education: George Washington University
- Known for: Systematics and evolutionary biology of polychaetes known as fan worms and the philosophical foundations of phylogenetic systematics.
- Awards: Thorne research fellow
- Scientific career
- Fields: Evolution
- Workplaces: Curator Museum of Natural History, Los Angeles County
- Doctoral advisor: V. A. Funk

Kirk J. Fitzhugh is the curator at the Natural History Museum of Los Angeles County, a position he has held since 1990. His research focuses on the systematics of polychaetes and on the philosophical foundations of evolutionary theory. Fitzhugh is a critic of DNA barcoding methods as a technical substitute for systematics. He attends Willi Hennig Society meetings where he has argued that "synapomorphy as evidence does not meet the scientific standard of independence...a particularly serious challenge to phylogenetic systematics, because it denies that the most severely tested and least disconfirmed cladogram can also maximize explanatory power." His graduate supervisor was V. A. Funk, from the U.S. National Herbarium, National Museum of Natural History, Smithsonian Institution MRC. He completed his doctoral thesis on Systematics and phylogeny of Sabellid polychaetes in 1988 while he was a research scientist at the LA County museum He married a lawyer named Nancy E. Gold in 1989.

== Publications ==
- Fitzhugh, K. (1989). "A systematic revision of the Sabellidae-Caobangiidae-Sabellongidae complex (Annelida, Polychaeta)." Bull. Am. Mus. Nat. Hist. 192: 1-104
- Fitzhugh, K. (1990). "Two new genera of the subfamily Fabriciinae (Polychaeta, Sabellidae)." American Museum Novitates 2967: 1-19
- Fitzhugh, K. (1990) Fabricinuda, a new genus of Fabriciinae (Polychaeta: Sabellidae). Proc. Biol. Soc. Wash. 103: 161-178.
- Fitzhugh, K. (1990). "A revision of the genus Fabricia blainville, 1828 (polychaeta: sabellidae: fabriciinae)." Sarsia 75(1):1-16
- Fitzhugh, K. (1990). "Two new genera of the subfamily Fabriciinae (Polychaeta: Sabellidae)." Am. Mus. Novitates 2967: 1-19.
- Fitzhugh, K. (1990). "Revision of the Fabriciinae genus Fabriciola Friedrich, 1939 (Polychaeta: Sabellidae)." Zool. Scr. 19: 153-164.
- Fitzhugh, K. (1990). "Revision of the Fabriciinae genus Augeneriella Banse, 1957 (Polychaeta: Sabellidae). J. Nat. Hist. 24: 195-218.
- Fitzhugh, K. (1991). Further revisions of the Sabellidae subfamilies and cladistic relationships among the Fabriciinae (Annelida: Polychaeta). Zoological Journal of the Linnean Society, 102(4), 305–332. doi:10.1111/j.1096-3642.1991.tb00004.x
- Fitzhugh, K. (1991). Systematics of several fabriciin fan worms (Polychaeta: Sabellidae: Fabriciinae) previously referred to Fabricia and Fabriciola. J. Nat. Hist. 25: 1101-1120.
- Fitzhugh, K. (1991). Uncini and the anchor-function hypothesis: Empirical tests and causal explanations. Bull. of Mar. Sci. 48(2): 574-583.
- Fitzhugh, K. (1992). "On the systematic position of Monroika africana (Monro) (Polychaeta: Sabellidae: Fabriciinae) and a description of a new fabriciin genus and species from Australia." Proc. Biol. Soc. Wash. 105: 1116-131.
- Fitzhugh, K. (1992). "Species of Fabriciola Friedrich, 1939 (Polychaeta: Sabellidae: Fabriciinae), from the California coast." Pacific Sci. 46: 68-76
- Fitzhugh, K. (1993). "Novafabricia brunnea (Hartman, 1969), new combination, with an update on relationships among Fabriciinae taxa (Polychaeta: Sabellidae)." Contr. Sci. Nat. Hist. Mus. Los Angeles County 438: 1-12.
- Fitzhugh, K. Giangrande, A., & Simboura, N. (1994). New species of Pseudofabriciola Fitzhugh, 1990 (Polychaeta: Sabellidae: Fabriciinae), from the Mediterranean Sea. Zoological Journal of the Linnean Society, 110(3), 219–241. doi:10.1111/j.1096-3642.1994.tb02016.x
- Fitzhugh, K. (1998). "New fan worm genera and species (Polychaeta, Sabellidae, Fabriciinae) from the western Pacific, and cladistic relationships among genera." Zoologica Scripta, 27(3), 209–245. doi:10.1111/j.1463-6409.1998.tb00438.x
- Fitzhugh, K. (1999). "New fanworm species (Polychaeta: Sabellidae: Fabriciinae) from Phuket, Thailand, with comments on Fabriciola flammula Rouse and Fabriciola cri Rouse." Contr. Sci. Nat. Hist. Mus. Los Angeles County 477: 1-17.
- Fitzhugh, K. & Rouse, G. W. (1999). A remarkable new genus and species of fan worm (Polychaeta: Sabellidae: Sabellinae) associated with marine gastropods. Invertebrate Biology 118(4): 357-390
- Fitzhugh, K. (2002) "New species of Fabricinuda Fitzhugh and Pseudofabriciola Fitzhugh (Polychaeta: Sabellidae: Fabriciinae), with an emendation of Pseudofabriciola australiensis (Hartmann-Schröder)." J. Nat. Hist. 36: 893-925.
- Fitzhugh, K. (2002) Fan worm polychaetes (Sabellidae: Sabellinae) collected during the Thai-Danish Bioshelf Project. Phuket Marine Biological Center Special Publication 24: 353-424.
- Fitzhugh, K. (2003). "A New Species of Megalomma Johansson, 1927 (Polychaeta: Sabellidae: Sabellinae) from Taiwan, with Comments on Sabellid Dorsal Lip Classification." Zoological Studies 42(1): 106-134
- Fitzhugh, K. (2005). The inferential basis of species hypotheses: the solution to defining the term “species.” Marine Ecology, 26(3-4), 155–165. doi:10.1111/j.1439-0485.2005.00058.x
- Fitzhugh, K. (2006). "The abduction of phylogenetic hypotheses." Zootaxa 1145: 1–110.
- Fitzhugh, K. (2006). "The 'requirement of total evidence' and its role in phylogenetic systematics." Biology and Philosophy 21(3), 309–351. doi:10.1007/s10539-005-7325-2
- Fitzhugh, K. (2006). "The philosophical basis of character coding for the inference of phylogenetic hypotheses." Zoologica Scripta, 35(3), 261–286. doi:10.1111/j.1463-6409.2006.00229.x
- Fitzhugh, K. (2006). DNA Barcoding: An Instance of Technology-driven Science? BioScience, 56(6), 462–463.
- Fitzhugh, K. (2007). "Fact, theory, test and evolution". Zoologica Scripta 37 (1): 109–113. DOI:10.1111/j.1463-6409.2007.00308.x
- Fitzhugh, K. (2008). Clarifying the role of character loss in phylogenetic inference. Zoologica Scripta, 37(5), 561–569. doi:10.1111/j.1463-6409.2008.00338.x
- Fitzhugh, K. (2008). Abductive Inference: Implications for “Linnean” and “Phylogenetic” Approaches for Representing Biological Systematization. Evolutionary Biology, 35(1), 52–82. doi:10.1007/s11692-008-9015-x
- Fitzhugh, K. (2009). "Species as explanatory hypotheses: Refinements and implications." Acta Biotheoretica, 57(1), 201–248. doi:10.1007/s10441-009-9071-3
- Fitzhugh, K. (2009). "Between macro and molecular." BioScience, 59(1), 85–86.
- Fitzhugh, K. (2010). "Evidence for evolution versus evidence for intelligent design: Parallel confusions". Evol Biol 37: 68–92. DOI:10.1007/s11692-010-9088-1
- Fitzhugh, K. (2010). "Revised systematics of Fabricia oregonica Banse, 1956 (Polychaeta: Sabellidae: Fabriciinae): an example of the need for a uninomial nomenclatural system." Zootaxa 2647: 35–50
- Fitzhugh, K. (2011). Beyond Cladistics: The Branching of a Paradigm. BioScience, 61(8), 638–639. doi:10.1525/bio.2011.61.8.11
- Fitzhugh, K. (2011). Phylogenetic Systematics by Any Other Name? BioScience, 61(8), 638–639.

=== Secondary co-authorship ===
- Farris, J. S., Källersjö, M., Albert, V. A., Allard, M., Anderberg, A., Bowditch, B., Bult, C., et al. (1995). Explanation. Cladistics, 11(2), 211–218. doi:10.1111/j.1096-0031.1995.tb00086.x
- Geiger, D. L., Fitzhugh, K., & Thacker, C. E. (2001). Timeless characters: a response to Vermeij (1999). Paleobiology, 27(1), 177 –178. doi:10.1666/0094-8373(2001)027<0177:TCARTV>2.0.CO;2
- Huang, D., Fitzhugh, K., & Rouse, G. W. (2011). Inference of phylogenetic relationships within Fabriciidae (Sabellida, Annelida) using molecular and morphological data. Cladistics, 27(4), 356–379. doi:10.1111/j.1096-0031.2010.00343.x
- Rouse, G., & Fitzhugh, K. (1994). Broadcasting fables: Is external fertilization really primitive? Sex, size, and larvae in sabellid polychaetes. Zoologica Scripta, 23(4), 271–312. doi:10.1111/j.1463-6409.1994.tb00390.x
- Siddall, M. E., Fitzhugh, K., & Coates, K. A. (1998). Problems Determining the Phylogenetic Position of Echiurans and Pogonophorans with Limited Data. Cladistics, 14(4), 401–410. doi:10.1111/j.1096-0031.1998.tb00347.x
