= Lisa Urry =

American scientist and textbook author

- Education: Tufts University (B.S.); University of California, Berkeley (Ph.D.)
- Occupation: Biologist
- Known for: Co-authoring Campbell Biology; Studying sea urchins
- Scientific career
- Fields: Biology
- Workplaces: Mills College

Lisa A. Urry is an American scientist and textbook author. She is best known as the lead author of the widely used textbook Campbell Biology. The title is popular worldwide and has been used by over 700,000 students in both high school and college-level classes. She has played a significant role in the continued development and success of this influential textbook since joining the author team of Campbell Biology.

== Early life and education ==
Lisa Urry earned her Bachelor of Science degree from Tufts University. She went on to receive her Ph.D. in Biology from the University of California, Berkeley. Her academic career has included teaching at Mills College, where she also served as chair of the biology department.

Urry's primary focus has been on biological education. Her expertise in various areas of biology, including sea urchins, combined with her experience as an educator, has been instrumental in shaping the content and pedagogical approach of Campbell Biology.

== Contributions to biology education ==
Urry became a co-author of Campbell Biology starting with the ninth edition, following the passing of the original author, Neil Campbell. She has been a driving force in updating and refining the textbook to reflect the latest advancements in the field of biology and to improve its effectiveness as a teaching tool. The textbook is widely acclaimed and is used in 90 percent of AP Biology classes and 60 percent of introductory college biology courses. The textbook has been used by over 14 million students and has been translated into over 20 languages.

Her contributions have ensured that the textbook remains current, comprehensive, and accessible to a broad range of students. She has been involved in integrating new discoveries, incorporating modern pedagogical strategies, and adapting the content to meet the evolving needs of biology education.

Beyond her work on Campbell Biology, Urry has also been involved in other educational initiatives and has contributed to the broader field of biology education through her teaching and leadership roles. She played a key role in The Global Teaching Project, which aims to provide access to advanced STEM courses for impoverished students.

== Publications ==
- Pilot hatchery for the queen conch, Strombus gigas, shows potential for inexpensive and appropriate technology for larval aquaculture in the Bahamas (1989)
- Integrin heterodimer and receptor complexity in avian and mammalian cells (1989)
- Analysis and distribution of integrins in chicken embryos (1990)
- Receptor functions for the integrin VLA-3: Fibronectin, collagen, and laminin binding are differentially influenced by ARG-GLY-ASP peptide and by divalent cations (1991)
- The evolution of thrombospondin gene family (1994)
- Expression of α4 Integrin mRNA and Protein and Fibronectin in the Early Chicken Embryo (1994)
- Strongylocentrotus purpuratus endo16 mRNA, larger alternatively spliced form, partial cds and 3'UTR (1996)
- Alternative Splicing of the Endo16Transcript Produces Differentially Expressed mRNAs during Sea Urchin Gastrulation (1996)
- Thrombospondins in early Xenopus embryos: Dynamic patterns of expression suggest diverse roles in nervous system, notochord, and muscle development (1998)
- Expression of Spicule Matrix Proteins in the Sea Urchin Embryo during Normal and Experimentally Altered Spiculogenesis (2000)
- The Larval Stages of the Sea Urchin, Strongylocentrotus purpuratus (2008)
- Campbell Biology 9th Edition (2010)
- Campbell Biology 10th Edition (2013)
- Campbell Biology 11th Edition (2016)
- Campbell Biology 12th Edition (2020)
