= The Lying Stones of Marrakech =

- Author: Stephen Jay Gould
- Publisher: Harmony Books
- Publication date: April 11, 2000
- Media type: Print (hardcover and paperback)
- Pages: 384
- ISBN: 0-609-60142-3
- OCLC: 59557303
- Dewey Decimal: 508 21
- LC Class: QH45.5 .G74 2000
- Preceded by: Leonardo's Mountain of Clams and the Diet of Worms
- Followed by: I Have Landed

The Lying Stones of Marrakech (2000) is the ninth volume of collected essays by the Harvard paleontologist, Stephen Jay Gould.

The essays were culled from his monthly column "The View of Life" in Natural History magazine, to which Gould contributed for nearly 30 years. The book addresses themes familiar to Gould's writing, including evolution and its teaching, science biography, probability, and iconoclasm.
