= Benjamin Cummings =

American publishing imprint

- Parent company: Pearson Education
- Founded: 1977
- Country of origin: United States
- Headquarters location: San Francisco
- Publication types: Textbooks
- Nonfiction topics: Anatomy & Physiology, Biology, Chemistry, Health & Kinesiology, Microbiology, and Physics & Astronomy
- Official website: www.pearsonhighered.com

Benjamin Cummings is a publishing imprint of Pearson Education that specializes in science. Benjamin Cummings publishes medical textbooks, anatomy and physiology laboratory manuals, biology and microbiology textbooks, and health/kinesiology textbooks.

Cummings Publishing Company was formed in 1968 as a division of Addison-Wesley. In 1977, Addison-Wesley purchased the W. A. Benjamin Company and merged it with Cummings. Benjamin Cummings, along with the rest of Addison-Wesley, was purchased by Pearson in 1988.
