= Giuseppe Arbia =

Italian statistician (born 1958)

Giuseppe Arbia (born July 3, 1958) is an Italian statistician. He is known for his contributions to the field of spatial statistics and spatial econometrics. In 2006 together with Jean Paelinck he founded the Spatial Econometrics Association, which he has been chairing ever since.

== Education and career ==
Giuseppe Arbia earned his bachelor's degree cum laude from Sapienza University of Rome in 1981, and the Doctor of Philosophy from Cambridge University in 1987. In 1994 he become full professor. He currently holds the chair of Economic Statistics at the Catholic University of the Sacred Heart in Milan and he is also Lecturer at the University of Italian Switzerland in Lugano. He is the Leading Editor of the book series Spatial Statistics and Spatial Econometrics, by Elsevier, Editor-in-Chief of the Journal of Spatial Econometrics, by Springer-Verlag and Director of the Spatial Econometrics Advanced Institute. In his career he published 8 books and more than 200 articles, book chapters and reviews. He is credited with coining Arbia's law of geography, also known as the second law of geography.

== Selected works ==
=== Books ===
- Spatial Microeconometrics (with G. Espa and D. Giuliani), Routledge, ISBN 978-1-138-83374-6, 2021.
- A primer for Spatial Econometrics: with applications in R. Texts in Econometrics, Palgrave Macmillan, ISBN 978-1-403-90172-9, 2014.
- Spatial Econometrics: Statistical foundations and applications to regional convergence, Springer-Verlag, Berlin, ISBN 3-540- 32304-X, March, 2006.
- Spatial data configuration in statistical analysis of regional economics and related problems", Advanced Statistical Theory and Applied Econometrics, Kluwer Academic Publisher: Dordrecht, The Netherlands, 1989, ISBN 0792302842, pp. xiv+ 256.

=== Articles and book chapters ===
- Arbia G, Bassi, F. and Falorsi, P. Observed and estimated prevalence of COVID-19 in Italy: How to estimate the total cases from medical swabs data, Science of the Total Environment, 2020.
- Arbia G, Elhorst, JP and Piras, G, Growth and convergence in a multi-regional model with space-time dynamics, Geographical Analysis, 42, 3, 338–355, 2010.
- Arbia G, Battisti, M and Di Vaio, G, Institutions and geography: empirical test of spatial growth models in European regions, Economic Modelling, 27, 12–21, 2009.
- Arbia G, Espa, G. and Quah, D., A class of spatial econometric methods in the empirical analysis of clusters of firms in space, Empirical Economics, 34, 1, 81–103, 2008.
- Arbia G, and Lafratta, G, Anisotropic spatial sampling designs for urban pollution Journal of the Royal Statistical Society series c – Applied Statistics, 51, 2, 2002, 223-234
- Arbia G, The role of spatial effects in the empirical analysis of regional concentration, International Journal of Geographical Systems, 3, 3, 271–281, 2001.
- Arbia G, Modelling the geography of economic activities on a continuous space, Papers in Regional Sciences, 80, 411–424, 2001.
- Arbia G, Haining R. P. and Griffith D. A.Error propagation in raster GIS: overlay operations, International Journal of Geographical Information Science, 12,2, 145–167, 1998.
- Arbia, G., Benedetti, R. and Espa, G. 'Effects of the MAUP on image classification', Geographical Systems, 3, pp. 123-4, 1996.
- Arbia G, The use of GIS in spatial surveys", International Statistical Review, 61, 2, 339–359, 1993.
