= Manfred M. Fischer =

Austrian and German regional scientist

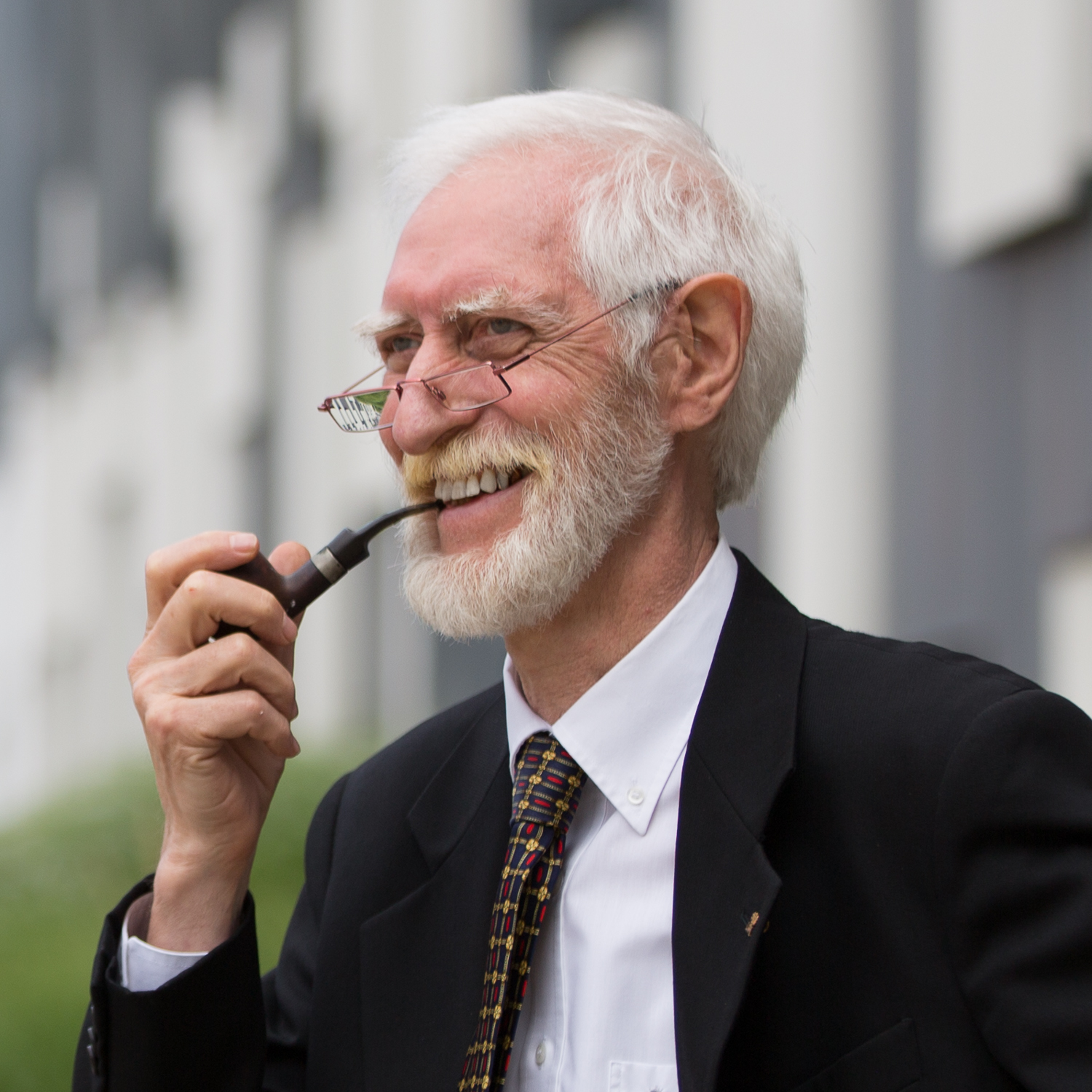
- Born: 25 February 1947; Nuremberg, Germany

Academic background
- Education: University of Erlangen–Nuremberg

Academic work
- Discipline: Regional Science, Spatial econometrics
- Institutions: WU-Vienna University of Economics and Business
- Awards: Bronze Medal of Masaryk University in Brno (2021); Founder's Medal of RSAI (2016); Jean Paelinck Award (2015); ERSA Prize in Regional Science (2012); RSAI Fellows Award (2006)

Manfred M. Fischer (born 25 February 1947) is an Austrian and German regional scientist, Emeritus Professor of economic geography at the WU-Vienna University of Economics and Business, and adjunct professor at the Institute of Geographic Sciences and Natural Resources Research, Chinese Academy of Sciences in Beijing.

== Biography ==
Manfred M. Fischer earned his doctorate (Dr. rer. nat. degree) summa cum laude in geography and mathematics from Friedrich-Alexander University Erlangen (Germany) in January 1975. He had started his academic career in September 1975 at the Institute for Geography and Regional Research, University of Vienna, the institution from which he received his habilitation degree (venia docendi) in human (economic and social) geography in May 1982, with a thesis entitled A Methodology of Regional Taxonomy.

In December 1988 he was appointed Professor and Chair in Economic Geography at WU-Vienna University of Economics and Business where he assumed the headship of the Institute for Economic Geography and GIScience from 1989 to 2015. He also directed the Institute for Urban and Regional Research at the Austrian Academy of Sciences, 1996-1999, and acted as Dean for Humanities, Social and Formal Sciences at WU-Vienna, 2002-2003, and for the Social Sciences from 2004 to 2009 at the same institution.

Dr. Fischer has mentored young scholars both in Austria and as a visiting professor to other institutions, including University of California at Santa Barbara (USA), Oskar Lange Academy of Economics in Wroclaw (Poland), Free University Amsterdam (Netherlands), University of Bologna (Italy), National Technical University of Athens (Greece), University of Joensuu (Finland), Leibniz University Hanover (Germany) and Johannes Kepler University Linz (Austria).

He is co-founder and joint editor-in-chief of the Journal of Geographical Systems (and its predecessor Geographical Systems), a journal with a distinct focus on the interface between modelling, statistical techniques and spatial issues in a broad spectrum. He is also co-founder and a co-editor of Springer’s book series, Advances in Spatial Science.

== Research ==
Dr. Fischer is an active researcher in regional science, crossing the boundaries to economics, statistics and computational science. He has made important contributions to the development of novel methods and techniques within spatial analysis, spatial statistics and spatial econometrics, and their application to a wide range of social science areas. His devotion to excellence in research has given him international recognition in the regional science community and beyond.

His research activities show a strong commitment to collaborative production of knowledge. In this spirit, he participated in several interdisciplinary scholarly programmes, such as, for example, the GISdata research programme and the Network for European Communication and Transportation Research (NECTAR) of the European Science Foundation, and presented his research at various international conferences.

Manfred M. Fischer is also known as a conference organizer. He has helped to design regional science conferences both in Europe and in North America, and has – in his capacity as Chair of the 500-person Commission on Mathematical Models of the International Geographical Union (1988-1996) – planned scholarly meetings and engaged in the developments of research relationships between scholars from different parts of the world including Australia, China, Eastern and Western Europe and North America.

== Publications ==
His publication list, with a majority of works written with colleagues, includes 20 monographs, 22 edited books and over 260 chapters in international books and articles in peer-reviewed academic journals. Some of his books have been translated into Chinese.

=== Selected books ===
- Fischer, Manfred M.; Nijkamp, Peter (2021). Handbook of Regional Science, 2nd and extended edition, (3 volumes). Springer. doi:10.1007/978-3-662-60723-7. ISBN 978-3-662-60724-4. S2CID 133583930.
- Fischer, Manfred M.; Wang, Jinfeng (2011). Spatial Data Analysis. Models, Methods and Techniques. Springer. doi:10.1007/978-3-642-21720-3. ISBN 978-3-642-21720-3.
- Fischer, Manfred M.; Getis, Arthur (2010). Handbook of Applied Spatial Analysis. Springer. doi:10.1007/978-3-642-03647-7. ISBN 978-3-642-03646-0.
- Fischer, Manfred M. (2006). Spatial Analysis and GeoComputation – Selected Essays. Springer. doi:10.1007/3-540-35730-0. ISBN 978-3-540-35729-2.
- Fischer, Manfred M. (2006). Innovation, Networks, and Knowledge Spillovers – Selected Essays. Springer. doi:10.1007/3-540-35981-8. ISBN 978-3-540-35981-4.
- Fischer, Manfred M.; Diez, Revilla; Snickars, Folke (2001). Metropolitan Innovation Systems. Springer. doi:10.1007/978-3-662-04630-2. ISBN 978-3-642-07548-3.

=== Selected journal articles ===
- Gopal, Sucharita; Fischer, Manfred M. (2023). "Opioid mortality in the US: Quantifying the direct and indirect impact of sociodemographic and socioeconomic factors". Letters in Spatial and Resource Sciences. 16 (1). doi:10.1007/s12076-023-00350-y. hdl:2144/48479.
- Fischer, Manfred M.; Hauzenberger, Niko; Huber, Florian; Pfarrhofer, Michael (2023). "General Bayesian time-varying parameter VARs for predicting government bond yields". Journal of Applied Econometrics. 38 (1): 69–87. arXiv:2102.13393. doi:10.1002/jae.2936. S2CID 252055311.
- Zhu, D.; Liu, Y.; Yao, X.; Fischer, Manfred M. (2021). "Spatial regression graph convolutional neural networks. A deep learning paradigm for spatial multivariate distributions". Geoinformatica. 26 (4): 645–676. doi:10.1007/s10707-021-00454-x. S2CID 240358227.
- Fischer, Manfred M.; Huber, Florian; Pfarrhofer, Michael (2021). "The regional transmission of uncertainty shocks on income inequality in the United States". Journal of Economic Behavior & Organization. 183: 887–900. arXiv:1806.08278. doi:10.1016/j.jebo.2019.03.004. S2CID 159443120.
- Fischer, Manfred M.; Huber, Florian; Pfarrhofer, Michael; Staufer-Steinnocher, Petra (2021). "The dynamic impact of monetary policy on regional housing prices in the United States". Real Estate Economics. 49 (4): 1039–1068. arXiv:1802.05870. doi:10.1111/1540-6229.12274. hdl:10419/201675.
- Fischer, Manfred M.; LeSage, James P. (2020). "Network dependence in multi-indexed data on international trade flows". Journal of Spatial Econometrics. 1 (1). doi:10.1007/s43071-020-00005-w. S2CID 216209666.
- Huber, Florian; Fischer, Manfred M. (2018). "A Markov switching factor-augmented VAR model for analyzing US business cycles and monetary policy". Oxford Bulletin of Economics and Statistics. 80 (3): 575–604. doi:10.1111/obes.12227. S2CID 52222354.
- Fischer, Manfred M. (2011). "A spatial Mankiw-Romer-Weil model: Theory and evidence". The Annals of Regional Science. 47 (2): 419–436. doi:10.1007/s00168-010-0384-6. S2CID 154405908.
- Fingleton, Bernard; Fischer, Manfred M. (2010). "Neoclassical theory versus new economic geography: Competing explanations of cross-regional variation in economic development". The Annals of Regional Science. 44 (3): 467–491. doi:10.1007/s00168-008-0278-z. S2CID 56265302.
- LeSage, James P.; Fischer, Manfred M. (2008). "Spatial growth regressions: Model specification, estimation and interpretation". Spatial Economic Analysis. 3 (3): 275–304. doi:10.1080/17421770802353758.
- Leung, Yee; Fischer, Manfred M.; Wu, Wei-Zhi; Mi, Ju-Sheng (2008). "A rough set approach for the discovery of classification rules in interval-valued information systems". International Journal of Approximate Reasoning. 47 (2): 233–246. doi:10.1016/j.ijar.2007.05.001.
- Fischer, Manfred M.; Reismann, Martin (2002). "A methodology for neural spatial interaction modeling". Geographical Analysis. 34 (3): 207–228. doi:10.1111/j.1538-4632.2002.tb01085.x.

== Honours and awards ==
Manfred M. Fischer is one of the most cited regional scientists. He has been named as one of the fifteen most influential authors in regional science over the period 1990-1999, in regional science publication patterns in the 1990s. He is listed among the most cited scholars during the 1977-1989 and the 1990-2001 periods and among the all-time intellectual leaders of regional science and listed as top economic geographer in the German-speaking world (based on research output and citations).

Dr. Fischer is the first recipient of the prestigious Jean Paelinck Award of the Regional Science Association International (RSAI), honouring outstanding scholarly achievements in the field of regional science methods (ERSA Congress in Lisbon, 2015). In addition, he has received the Founder's Medal of RSAI that is awarded every four years to scholars who have made significant lifelong contributions to regional science (ERSA Congress in Vienna, 2016). Other accolades include the ERSA Prize in Regional Science (ERSA Congress in Bratislava, 2012), the RSAI Fellows Award (North American Meetings of the RSAI in Toronto, 2006) and Special Issues of the International Regional Science Review and the Review of Regional Studies, edited in his honour.

In 2021, he has received the Bronze Medal of Masaryk University in Brno (Czech Republic), awarded for long-term contributions to the development of the Faculty of Economics and Administration of the university where a library for Ph.D. students in regional economics – named the Manfred M. Fischer library – had been opened in 2019.

== Learned societies ==
- Foreign Member, Royal Netherlands Academy of Arts and Sciences (KNAW), elected 1999
- Corresponding Member, Austrian Academy of Sciences (AAS), elected 1996
- Fellow, International Academy of Sciences for Europe and Asia (IEAS), elected 1995
