= Climate of Anchorage =

Climate chart for Anchorage

Anchorage, Alaska (Dena'ina: Dgheyay Kaq'; Dgheyaytnu) has a subarctic climate with the code Dsc according to the Köppen climate classification due to its short, cool summers. The weather on any given day is very unpredictable. Some winters feature several feet of snow and cold temperatures, while the summers are typically mild but are cool compared to the contiguous US and interior Alaska. Because of Anchorage's high latitude, summer days are very long and winter daylight hours are very short. The longest day of sunlight being 19hrs and 21 minutes, and shortest being 5 hours and 28 minutes. Anchorage is often cloudy during the winter, which decreases the amount of sunlight experienced by residents.

== Temperature ==
=== Averages ===
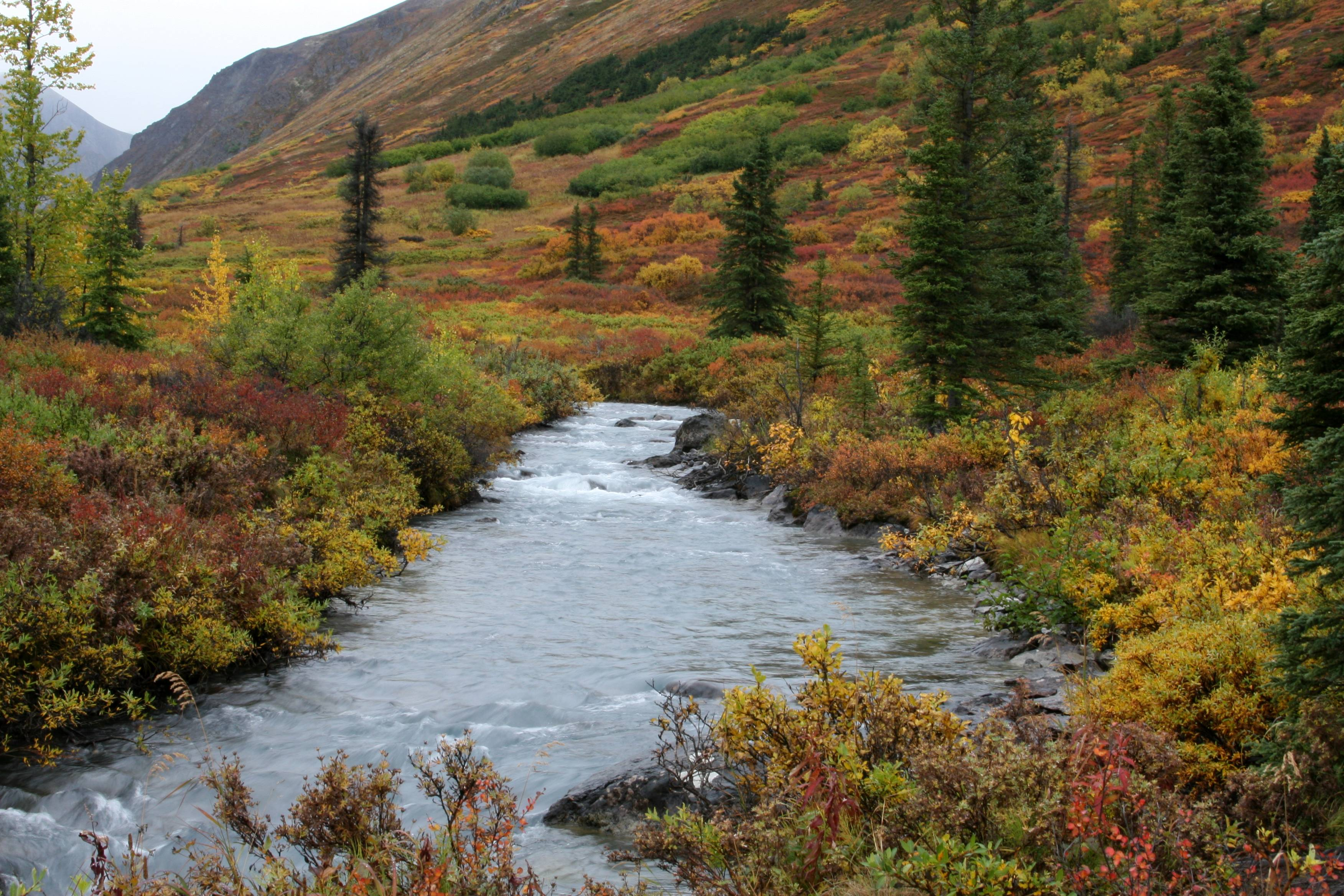
Autumn in Eagle River AK

Average daytime summer temperatures range from approximately 55 to 78 °F (13 to 26 °C); average daytime winter temperatures are about 5 to 30 °F (−15 to −1 °C). Anchorage has a frost-free growing season that averages slightly over one hundred days. Average January low and high temperatures at Ted Stevens Anchorage International Airport (PANC) are 11 / 23 °F (−11.7 / −5.0 °C) with an average winter snowfall of 75.59 inches, or 1.92 meters. Farther afield at the Campbell Airstrip is another weather station recording colder night temperatures in both summer and winter.

Average July low and high temperatures are 52 / 66 °F (11.1 / 18.9 °C) and the hottest reading ever recorded was 90 °F or 32.2 °C on July 4, 2019.

=== Highest daily temperatures ===
Period	Record temperature	Date
January	50 °F (10 °C)	January 27, 2014; January 19, 1961
February	49 °F (9 °C)	Feb 27, 2014
March	53 °F (12 °C)	Mar 31, 2016
April	69 °F (21 °C)	Apr 29, 2005
May	77 °F (25 °C)	May 21, 2002; May 24, 1969
June	85 °F (29 °C)	Jun 14, 1969
July	90 °F (32 °C)	Jul 4, 2019
August	82 °F (28 °C)	Aug 2, 1978; Aug 21, 1977; Aug 6, 1968
September	73 °F (23 °C)	Sep 5, 1957
October	64 °F (18 °C)	Oct 9, 2006
November	54 °F (12 °C)	Nov 26, 2002
December	51 °F (11 °C)	Dec 9, 2019

=== Lowest daily temperatures ===
Period	Record temperature	Date
January	−34 °F (−37 °C)	Jan 5, 1975
February	−28 °F (−33 °C)	Feb 4, 1999
March	−24 °F (−31 °C)	Mar 7, 1971
April	−4 °F (−20 °C)	Apr 2, 1985
May	17 °F (−8 °C)	May 10, 1964
June	33 °F (1 °C)	Jun 4, 1961
July	36 °F (2 °C)	Jul 1, 1964
August	31 °F (−1 °C)	Aug 31, 1984; Aug 28, 1984
September	19 °F (−7 °C)	Sep 24, 1992
October	−5 °F (−21 °C)	Oct 31, 1956
November	−21 °F (−29 °C)	Nov 17, 1956
December	−30 °F (−34 °C)	Dec 27–28, 1961; Dec 14, 1964

=== Daily record warm minima ===
Period	Record temperature	Date
January	36 °F (2 °C)	Jan 20, 1990
February	37 °F (3 °C)	Feb 25, 1978
March	40 °F (4 °C)	Mar 26, 1970
April	44 °F (7 °C)	Apr 27, 2015; Apr 29, 2005
May	56 °F (13 °C)	May 31, 1993
June	61 °F (16 °C)	Jun 16, 2015
July	63 °F (17 °C)	Jul 10, 2005
August	63 °F (17 °C)	Aug 13–14, 2019
September	57 °F (14 °C)	Sep 6, 1993; Sep 5, 1965
October	52 °F (11 °C)	Oct 10, 1986
November	45 °F (7 °C)	Nov 9–10, 1979
December	37 °F (3 °C)	Dec 11, 2017; Dec 28, 1982

=== Daily record cold maxima ===
Period	Record temperature	Date
January	−19 °F (−28 °C)	Jan 28, 1989
February	−13 °F (−25 °C)	Feb 3–4, 1999
March	−2 °F (−19 °C)	Mar 7, 1971
April	14 °F (−10 °C)	Apr 1, 1985
May	27 °F (−3 °C)	May 9, 1964
June	47 °F (8 °C)	Jun 1–2, 1973
July	50 °F (10 °C)	Jul 27, 1971
August	50 °F (10 °C)	Aug 21, 1985; Aug 25, 1983
September	34 °F (1 °C)	Sep 30, 1992
October	13 °F (−11 °C)	Oct 31, 1975
November	−2 °F (−19 °C)	Nov 29–30, 1990
December	−17 °F (−27 °C)	Dec 28, 1961

== Precipitation ==
=== Rainfall ===
Between 2000 and 2022 the annual rainfall in Anchorage was 420 mm (16.7 in). The months with the highest average mean of rain were August and September, each having an annual mean of 70 mm (2.75 in) (August) and 82 mm (3.24 in) (September).

=== Snowfall ===
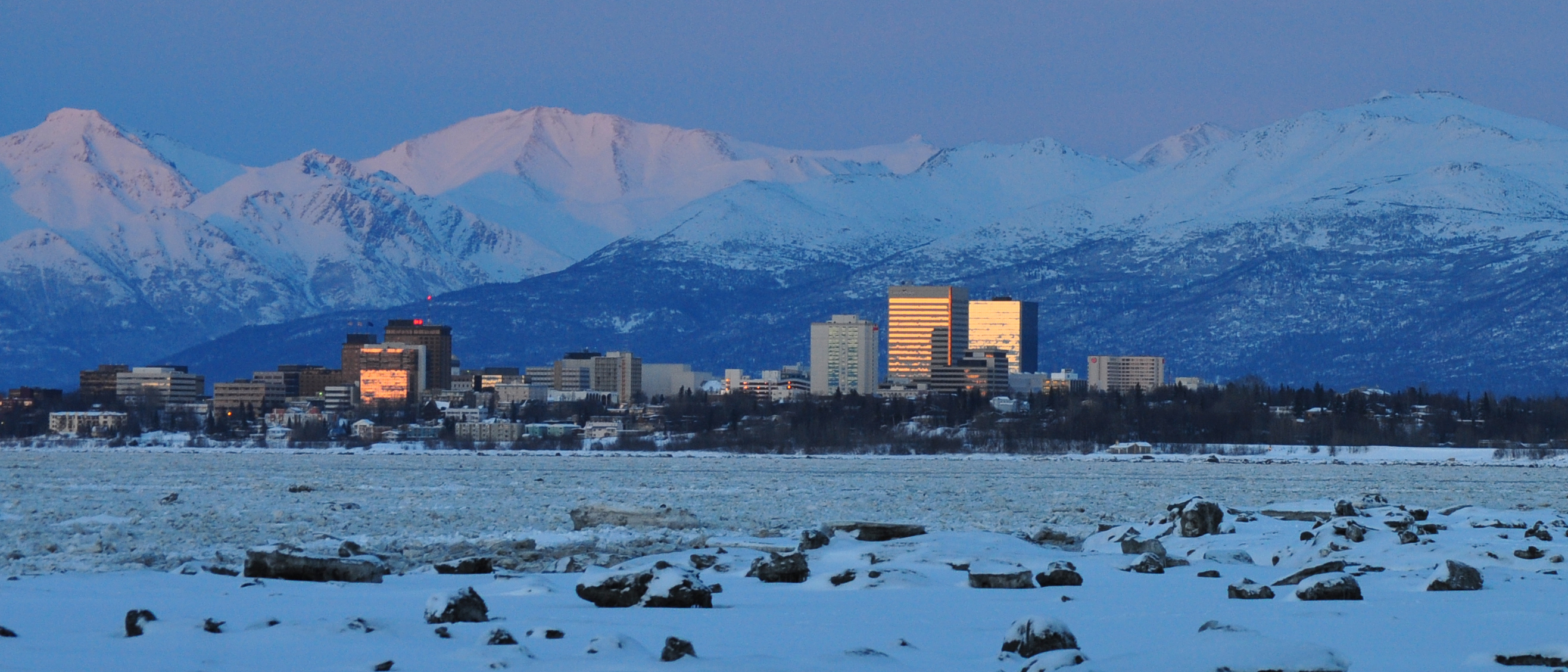
Winter view of Anchorage and the Chugach Mountains

For snowfall, the annual mean average for 2000 to 2022 was 194 centimeters or 76.4 inches; the highest snowfall season being 2011 - 2012 with 342 cm (134.5 in), and the lowest season being 64 cm (25.1 in) inches in 2015.

== Climate change ==
Based on the ERA5 data published by ECMWF, the annual mean temperature of Anchorage has increased from 0.8 °C in 1940 to 3.8 °C in 2022, an increase of 3 °C. The mayor and the assembly of Anchorage in 2019 issued a climate action plan for the anticipated effects that climate change will have on its city and people. The action plan includes all of the municipality of Anchorage, as far north as Eklutna and as south as Portage. One of the major goals of the climate action plan is to reduce green house gas emissions by 80% by the year 2050 from its 2008 emission levels. The first annual report on this came out in 2021. For its near term plans, the city also introduced a plan called the "Municipality of Anchorage Climate Action Strategy."

Anchorage

Climate chart (precipitation, max. and min. temperature)
J	F	M	A	M	J	J	A	S	O	N	D
0.7 23 11	0.7 27 14	0.6 34 19	0.5 45 29	0.8 56 39	1 63 47	1.8 66 52	3.2 64 49	3 55 41	2 40 29	1.2 27 17	1.1 24 13
- █ Average max. and min. temperatures in °F
- █ Precipitation totals in inches
Metric conversion
J	F	M	A	M	J	J	A	S	O	N	D
19 −5 −12	19 −3 −10	15 1 −7	12 7 −2	19 13 4	24 17 8	46 19 11	82 18 9	76 13 5	52 4 −2	30 −3 −8	28 −4 −11
- █ Average max. and min. temperatures in °C
- █ Precipitation totals in mm

== Notable climate events ==
Due to its proximity to active volcanoes, ash hazards are a significant, though infrequent, occurrence. The most recent notable incident was an August 1992 mark of Mt. Spurr, which is located 78 mi (126 km) west of the city. The eruption deposited about 3 mm (0.12 in) of volcanic ash on the city. The cleanup of ash resulted in excessive demands for water and caused major problems for the Anchorage Water and Wastewater Utility.

On March 17, 2002, there was a storm that caused 73 cm (28.6 in) of snow to close schools for two days. The storm broke the city record for the most snowfall in a single day. The storm beat the previous record from 1955 on March 16, which was just 40 cm (15.6 in). The National Weather Service also recorded this same snow data.

== Classifications ==
Anchorage Climate according to major climate systems
Climatic scheme	Initials	Description
Köppen system	Dsc	Continental subarctic climate (Note: Or only subarctic climate)
Trewartha system	E	Boreal climate
Alisov system	—N/a	Temperate climate (Note: Mid-latitude temperate interior climate)
Strahler system	—N/a	Boreal forest climate
Thornthwaite system	B1 C'1	Humid and microthermal
Neef system	—N/a	West side/maritime climate

== Trends in temperature, precipitation, and daylight hours ==
=== NWS office/international airport ===
Climate data for Ted Stevens Anchorage International Airport, Alaska (1991−2020 normals, extremes 1953−present)
Month	Jan	Feb	Mar	Apr	May	Jun	Jul	Aug	Sep	Oct	Nov	Dec	Year
Record high °F (°C)	50 (10)	49 (9)	53 (12)	69 (21)	77 (25)	85 (29)	90 (32)	82 (28)	73 (23)	64 (18)	54 (12)	51 (11)	90 (32)
Mean maximum °F (°C)	41.8 (5.4)	42.7 (5.9)	44.2 (6.8)	56.3 (13.5)	69.5 (20.8)	74.5 (23.6)	76.0 (24.4)	73.7 (23.2)	65.0 (18.3)	54.8 (12.7)	42.7 (5.9)	42.3 (5.7)	77.7 (25.4)
Mean daily maximum °F (°C)	22.7 (−5.2)	27.3 (−2.6)	33.0 (0.6)	45.1 (7.3)	56.3 (13.5)	63.4 (17.4)	66.2 (19.0)	64.0 (17.8)	55.7 (13.2)	42.0 (5.6)	28.9 (−1.7)	25.0 (−3.9)	44.1 (6.7)
Daily mean °F (°C)	16.9 (−8.4)	21.3 (−5.9)	25.8 (−3.4)	37.5 (3.1)	48.1 (8.9)	55.9 (13.3)	59.6 (15.3)	57.5 (14.2)	49.3 (9.6)	36.3 (2.4)	23.6 (−4.7)	19.4 (−7.0)	37.6 (3.1)
Mean daily minimum °F (°C)	11.0 (−11.7)	15.2 (−9.3)	18.6 (−7.4)	29.9 (−1.2)	40.0 (4.4)	48.4 (9.1)	52.9 (11.6)	50.9 (10.5)	42.9 (6.1)	30.7 (−0.7)	18.3 (−7.6)	13.8 (−10.1)	31.0 (−0.6)
Mean minimum °F (°C)	−9.3 (−22.9)	−3.6 (−19.8)	1.2 (−17.1)	17.6 (−8.0)	30.7 (−0.7)	40.5 (4.7)	46.7 (8.2)	42.7 (5.9)	30.9 (−0.6)	16.1 (−8.8)	0.8 (−17.3)	−4.9 (−20.5)	−13.2 (−25.1)
Record low °F (°C)	−34 (−37)	−28 (−33)	−24 (−31)	−4 (−20)	17 (−8)	33 (1)	36 (2)	31 (−1)	19 (−7)	−5 (−21)	−21 (−29)	−30 (−34)	−34 (−37)
Average precipitation inches (mm)	0.75 (19)	0.86 (22)	0.69 (18)	0.43 (11)	0.65 (17)	1.02 (26)	1.82 (46)	2.93 (74)	3.10 (79)	1.82 (46)	1.19 (30)	1.16 (29)	16.42 (417)
Average snowfall inches (cm)	12.4 (31)	13.4 (34)	11.0 (28)	4.0 (10)	0.3 (0.76)	0.0 (0.0)	0.0 (0.0)	0.0 (0.0)	0.4 (1.0)	5.6 (14)	12.6 (32)	18.2 (46)	77.9 (198)
Average extreme snow depth inches (cm)	16.4 (42)	19.0 (48)	19.9 (51)	12.7 (32)	0.3 (0.76)	0.0 (0.0)	0.0 (0.0)	0.0 (0.0)	0.2 (0.51)	3.2 (8.1)	8.8 (22)	14.7 (37)	24.5 (62)
Average precipitation days (≥ 0.01 in)	8.1	7.9	6.0	4.9	6.5	8.6	11.7	14.4	14.9	11.5	9.8	10.8	115.1
Average snowy days (≥ 0.1 in)	8.8	7.8	6.1	2.5	0.3	0.0	0.0	0.0	0.3	3.2	7.7	10.8	47.5
Average relative humidity (%)	73.4	71.4	66.1	64.3	61.6	65.6	71.4	75.1	75.9	74.5	77.1	77.1	71.1
Average dew point °F (°C)	8.1 (−13.3)	11.1 (−11.6)	15.4 (−9.2)	24.1 (−4.4)	33.4 (0.8)	42.4 (5.8)	48.6 (9.2)	47.8 (8.8)	40.6 (4.8)	27.0 (−2.8)	15.3 (−9.3)	10.6 (−11.9)	27.0 (−2.8)
Mean monthly sunshine hours	82.9	120.5	195.8	235.3	288.7	274.7	250.1	203.9	159.8	117.1	80.6	51.8	2,061.2
Percentage possible sunshine	41	48	53	53	53	48	44	42	41	38	37	30	46
Average ultraviolet index	0	0	1	2	4	5	5	4	2	1	0	0	2
Source 1: NOAA (relative humidity and sun 1961–1990)
Source 2: Weather Atlas (UV)

Climate data for Anchorage
Month	Jan	Feb	Mar	Apr	May	Jun	Jul	Aug	Sep	Oct	Nov	Dec	Year
Average sea temperature °F (°C)	36.9 (2.8)	35.8 (2.1)	36.1 (2.3)	37.5 (3.0)	42.4 (5.8)	47.7 (8.8)	52.4 (11.3)	53.1 (11.7)	51.6 (10.9)	47.5 (8.6)	43.0 (6.1)	39.6 (4.2)	43.6 (6.5)
Mean daily daylight hours	7.0	9.0	12.0	15.0	18.0	19.0	18.0	16.0	13.0	10.0	7.0	6.0	12.5
Source: Weather Atlas

See or edit raw graph data.

=== Campbell airstrip ===
Climate data for Campbell airstrip (Anchorage Alaska)
Month	Jan	Feb	Mar	Apr	May	Jun	Jul	Aug	Sep	Oct	Nov	Dec	Year
Mean daily maximum °F (°C)	20 (−7)	26 (−3)	35 (2)	45 (7)	58 (14)	66 (19)	68 (20)	65 (18)	55 (13)	41 (5)	26 (−3)	22 (−6)	44 (7)
Mean daily minimum °F (°C)	2 (−17)	4 (−16)	9 (−13)	22 (−6)	33 (1)	41 (5)	47 (8)	44 (7)	35 (2)	22 (−6)	7 (−14)	5 (−15)	23 (−5)
Average snowfall inches (cm)	10 (25)	16 (41)	18 (46)	9 (23)	0.2 (0.51)	0 (0)	0 (0)	0 (0)	0 (0)	9 (23)	11 (28)	2 (5.1)	75.2 (191.61)
Source: NOAA

=== Merrill Field ===
Climate data for Merrill Field (1991−2020 normals, (Note: Mean monthly maxima and minima (i.e. the highest and lowest temperature readings during an entire month or year) calculated based on data at said location from 1991 to 2020.) extremes 1914−present)
Month	Jan	Feb	Mar	Apr	May	Jun	Jul	Aug	Sep	Oct	Nov	Dec	Year
Record high °F (°C)	56 (13)	57 (14)	56 (13)	71 (22)	92 (33)	100 (38)	93 (34)	90 (32)	73 (23)	67 (19)	62 (17)	54 (12)	100 (38)
Mean maximum °F (°C)	42.5 (5.8)	44.0 (6.7)	45.2 (7.3)	58.4 (14.7)	71.2 (21.8)	76.7 (24.8)	79.0 (26.1)	76.5 (24.7)	66.2 (19.0)	56.3 (13.5)	43.5 (6.4)	44.5 (6.9)	80.5 (26.9)
Mean daily maximum °F (°C)	22.6 (−5.2)	28.0 (−2.2)	34.4 (1.3)	47.1 (8.4)	58.4 (14.7)	65.7 (18.7)	68.4 (20.2)	65.7 (18.7)	56.8 (13.8)	42.5 (5.8)	29.0 (−1.7)	24.7 (−4.1)	45.3 (7.4)
Daily mean °F (°C)	15.4 (−9.2)	20.2 (−6.6)	25.6 (−3.6)	38.8 (3.8)	49.7 (9.8)	57.7 (14.3)	61.1 (16.2)	58.5 (14.7)	49.8 (9.9)	36.4 (2.4)	22.6 (−5.2)	18.0 (−7.8)	37.8 (3.2)
Mean daily minimum °F (°C)	8.2 (−13.2)	12.4 (−10.9)	16.9 (−8.4)	30.4 (−0.9)	41.1 (5.1)	49.7 (9.8)	53.9 (12.2)	51.3 (10.7)	42.8 (6.0)	30.3 (−0.9)	16.3 (−8.7)	11.3 (−11.5)	30.4 (−0.9)
Mean minimum °F (°C)	−10.8 (−23.8)	−5.6 (−20.9)	−1.5 (−18.6)	16.7 (−8.5)	32.0 (0.0)	41.9 (5.5)	47.2 (8.4)	42.2 (5.7)	30.3 (−0.9)	15.7 (−9.1)	−1.1 (−18.4)	−7.3 (−21.8)	−15.0 (−26.1)
Record low °F (°C)	−35 (−37)	−38 (−39)	−20 (−29)	−21 (−29)	1 (−17)	29 (−2)	34 (1)	31 (−1)	19 (−7)	−6 (−21)	−22 (−30)	−36 (−38)	−38 (−39)
Average precipitation inches (mm)	0.46 (12)	0.71 (18)	0.54 (14)	0.30 (7.6)	0.62 (16)	0.99 (25)	1.70 (43)	2.48 (63)	3.02 (77)	1.57 (40)	0.88 (22)	0.89 (23)	14.16 (360)
Average precipitation days (≥ 0.01 in)	6.0	6.4	6.0	4.5	6.5	9.9	12.4	15.6	15.0	11.4	7.4	8.1	109.2
Source: NOAA
