= Seascape ecology =

Seascape ecology is a scientific discipline that deals with the causes and ecological consequences of spatial pattern in the marine environment, drawing heavily on conceptual and analytical frameworks developed in terrestrial landscape ecology.

== Overview ==
Seascape ecology, the application of landscape ecology concepts to the marine environment has been slowly emerging since the 1970s, yielding new ecological insights and showing growing potential to support the development of ecologically meaningful science-based management practices. For marine systems, the application of landscape ecology came about through a recognition that many of the concepts developed in the theory of island biogeography and the study of patch dynamics (precursors to modern landscape ecology) could be applicable to a range of marine environments from plankton patches to patch reefs, inter-tidal mussel beds and seagrass meadows.

Progress in the ecological understanding of spatial patterning was not confined to shallow seafloor environments. For the open ocean, advances in ocean observing systems since the 1970s have allowed scientists to map, classify, quantify and track dynamic spatial structure in the form of eddies, surface roughness, currents, runoff plumes, ice, temperature fronts and plankton patches using oceanographic technologies – a theme increasingly referred to as pelagic seascape ecology. Subsurface structures too, such as internal waves, thermoclines, haloclines, boundary layers and stratification resulting in distinct layering of organisms, is increasingly being mapped and modelled in multiple dimensions.

Like landscape ecologists, seascape ecologists are interested in the spatially explicit geometry of patterns and the relationships between pattern, ecological processes and environmental change. A central tenet in landscape ecology is that patch context matters, where local conditions are influenced by attributes of the surroundings. For instance, the physical arrangement of objects in space, and their location relative to other things, influences how they function.

A landscape ecologist will ask different questions focused at different scales than other scientists, such as: What are the ecological consequences of different shaped patches, patch size, quality, edge geometry, spatial arrangement and diversity of patches across the landscape? At what scale(s) is structure most influential? How do landscape patterns influence the way that animals find food, evade predators and interact with competitors? How does human activity alter the structure and function of landscapes?

Several guiding principles that exist at the core of landscape ecology have made major contributions to terrestrial landscape planning and conservation, but in marine systems our understanding is still in its infancy. The first book on seascape ecology was published in December 2018.

Seascapes are defined broadly as spatially heterogeneous and dynamic spaces that can be delineated at a wide range of scales in time and space. With regard to seascapes defined by sampling units, a 1 m^{2} quadrat can be a valid seascape sample unit (SSU), just as can a 1 km^{2} analytical window in a geographical information system. The wide diversity of possible focal scales in marine ecology means that the term seascape cannot be used as an indication of scale, or a level of organization.

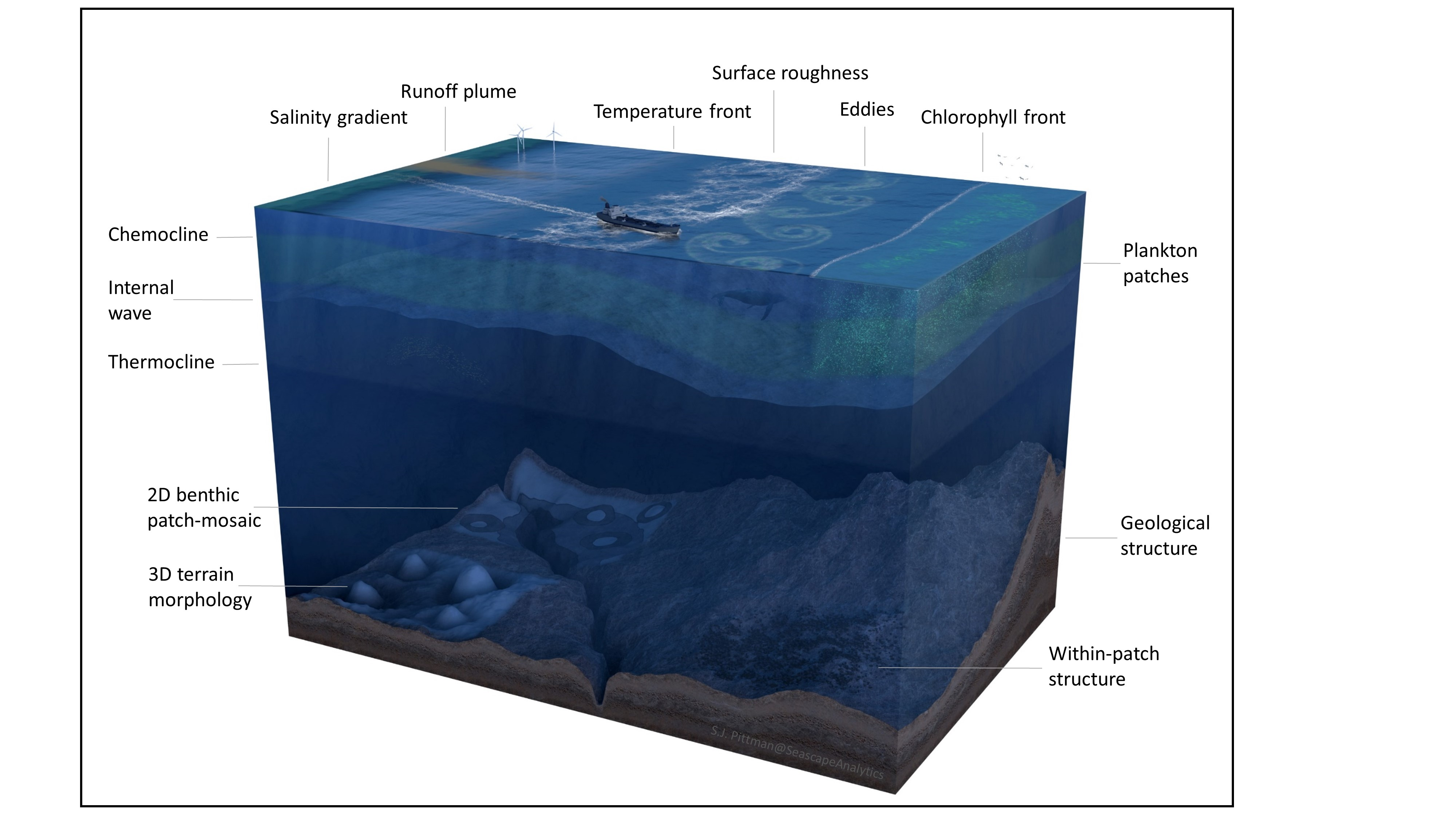
Seascape cube representing a hypothetical 3D ocean space showing structural patterns relevant to seascape ecology

== Seascape patterns ==
The sea exhibits complex spatial patterning that can be mapped and quantified, such as gradients in plant communities across tidal saltmarshes or the intricate mosaics of patches typical of coral reefs. In the open ocean too, dynamic spatial structure in the form of water currents, eddies, temperature fronts and plankton patches can be measured readily. Physical processes such as storms dramatically influence spatial patterning in the environment and human activity can also directly create patch structure, modify mosaic composition and even completely remove elements of the seascape. Furthermore, climate-change induced shifts in species related to water temperature change and sea level rise are driving a gradual reconfiguration of the geography of species and habitats.

The patterns revealed by remote sensing devices are most often mapped and represented using two types of model: (1) collections of discrete patches forming mosaics e.g. as represented in two-dimensional benthic habitat map, or (2) continuously varying gradients in three-dimensional terrain models e.g. in remotely sensed Bathymetric data. In landscape ecology, patches can be classified into a binary patch-matrix model based on island biogeography theory where a focal habitat patch type (e.g. seagrasses) is surrounded by an inhospitable matrix (e.g. sand), or a patch-mosaic of interconnected patches, where the interactions of the parts influence the ecological function of the whole mosaic. Both patch and gradient models have provided important insights into the spatial ecology of marine species and biodiversity.

== Scale matters ==
Scale, the spatial or temporal dimensions of a phenomenon, is central to seascape ecology and the topic permeates all applications of a seascape ecology approach from conceptual models through to design of sampling, analyses and interpretation of results. Species and life-stage responses to patchiness and gradients in environmental structure are likely to be scale dependent, therefore, scale selection is an important task in any ecological study. Seascape ecology acknowledges that decisions made for scaling ecological studies influence our perspective and ultimately our understanding of ecological patterns and processes. Historically, marine scientists have played a significant role in communicating the importance of scale in ecology

In 1963, a physical oceanographer, Henry Stommel, published a conceptual diagram that was to have a profound effect on all of the environmental sciences. The diagram depicted variation in sea level height at spatial scales from centimeters to that of the planet and at time scales from seconds to tens of millennia. The oceanographer John Steele (1978) adapted the Stommel diagram to depict the spatial and temporal scales of patchiness in phytoplankton, zooplankton and fish.

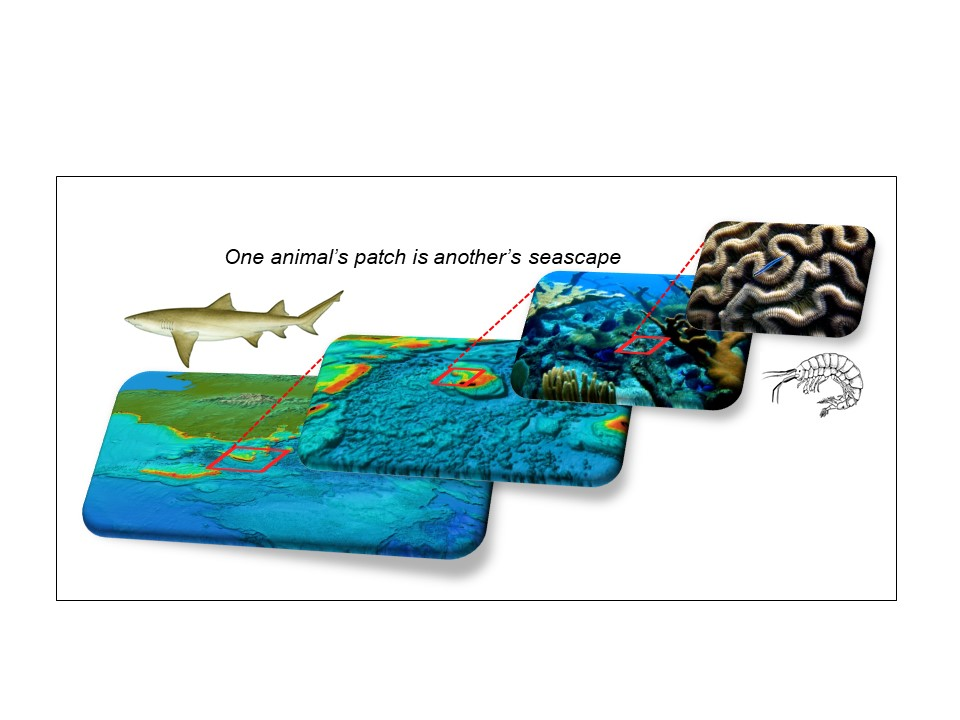
Seascape scales

Measuring habitat structure at multiple scales is typical in seascape ecology, particularly where a single meaningful scale is not known or not meaningful to the ecological process of interest. Multi-scale measurements have been used to discover the scale at which populations are associated with key habitat features. With regard to scaling seascapes, one approach is to select spatial and temporal scales to be ecologically meaningful to the organism’s movements or other processes of interest.

The absence of information, or the lack of continuous observation on the way animals use space through time, can all too often result in insufficient consideration of seascape context potentially resulting in misleading conclusions on the primary drivers of ecological patterns and processes. Pittman and McAlpine (2003) offer a multi-scale framework for scaling ecological studies that integrates hierarchy theory with movement ecology and the concept of ecological neighborhoods. Here the focal scale is guided by the spatial and temporal scales relevant to an ecological process of interest. The focal scale is nested within a spatial hierarchy that incorporates patterns and processes at both finer and broader scales

== Relationship to fisheries and hatcheries ==
Understanding seascape ecology is important in the study of juvenile fish development, particularly when examining estuaries. Prior investigations into nursery function have predominantly focused on individual habitats or specific species, lacking a comprehensive understanding of the intricate relationships within and among diverse habitat patches. This is of concern due to the frequent ontogenetic shifts observed in many juvenile species, which cause them to use multiple habitats throughout their developmental phases. Various habitats, including mangrove roots, macroalgae, seagrasses, and others, offer distinct services and resources crucial for the development of juvenile fish. The failure to consider the entirety of habitats occupied during development may impede ecologists and resource managers in effectively evaluating the conservation value and priority of estuarine regions.
