= Spatial ecology =

Study of the distribution or space occupied by species

Spatial ecology studies the ultimate distributional or spatial unit occupied by a species. In a particular habitat shared by several species, each of the species is usually confined to its own microhabitat or spatial niche because two species in the same general territory cannot usually occupy the same ecological niche for any significant length of time.

== Overview ==
In nature, organisms are neither distributed uniformly nor at random, forming instead some sort of spatial pattern. This is due to various energy inputs, disturbances, and species interactions that result in spatially patchy structures or gradients. This spatial variance in the environment creates diversity in communities of organisms, as well as in the variety of the observed biological and ecological events. The type of spatial arrangement present may suggest certain interactions within and between species, such as competition, predation, and reproduction. On the other hand, certain spatial patterns may also rule out specific ecological theories previously thought to be true.

Although spatial ecology deals with spatial patterns, it is usually based on observational data rather than on an existing model. This is because nature rarely follows set expected order. To properly research a spatial pattern or population, the spatial extent to which it occurs must be detected. Ideally, this would be accomplished beforehand via a benchmark spatial survey, which would determine whether the pattern or process is on a local, regional, or global scale. This is rare in actual field research, however, due to the lack of time and funding, as well as the ever-changing nature of such widely-studied organisms such as insects and wildlife. With detailed information about a species' life-stages, dynamics, demography, movement, behavior, etc., models of spatial pattern may be developed to estimate and predict events in unsampled locations.

== History ==
Most mathematical studies in ecology in the nineteenth century assumed a uniform distribution of living organisms in their habitat. In the past quarter century, ecologists have begun to recognize the degree to which organisms respond to spatial patterns in their environment. Due to the rapid advances in computer technology in the same time period, more advanced methods of statistical data analysis have come into use. Also, the repeated use of remotely sensed imagery and geographic information systems in a particular area has led to increased analysis and identification of spatial patterns over time. These technologies have also increased the ability to determine how human activities have impacted animal habitat and climate change. The natural world has become increasingly fragmented due to human activities; anthropogenic landscape change has had a ripple-effect impacts on wildlife populations, which are now more likely to be small, restricted in distribution, and increasingly isolated from one another. In part as a reaction to this knowledge, and partially due to increasingly sophisticated theoretical developments, ecologists began stressing the importance of spatial context in research. Spatial ecology emerged from this movement toward spatial accountability; "the progressive introduction of spatial variation and complexity into ecological analysis, including changes in spatial patterns over time".

== Concepts ==
=== Scale ===
In spatial ecology, scale refers to the spatial extent of ecological processes and the spatial interpretation of the data. The response of an organism or a species to the environment is particular to a specific scale, and may respond differently at a larger or smaller scale. Choosing a scale that is appropriate to the ecological process in question is very important in accurately hypothesizing and determining the underlying cause. Most often, ecological patterns are a result of multiple ecological processes, which often operate at more than one spatial scale. Through the use of such spatial statistical methods such as geostatistics and principal coordinate analysis of neighbor matrices (PCNM), one can identify spatial relationships between organisms and environmental variables at multiple scales.

=== Spatial autocorrelation ===
Spatial autocorrelation refers to the value of samples taken close to each other are more likely to have similar magnitude than by chance alone. When a pair of values located at a certain distance apart are more similar than expected by chance, the spatial autocorrelation is said to be positive. When a pair of values are less similar, the spatial autocorrelation is said to be negative. It is common for values to be positively autocorrelated at shorter distances and negative autocorrelated at longer distances. This is commonly known as Tobler's first law of geography, summarized as "everything is related to everything else, but nearby objects are more related than distant objects".

In ecology, there are two important sources of spatial autocorrelation, which both arise from spatial-temporal processes, such as dispersal or migration:

- True/inherent spatial autocorrelation arises from interactions among individuals located in close proximity. This process is endogenous (internal) and results in the individuals being spatially adjacent in a patchy fashion. An example of this would be sexual reproduction, the success of which requires the closeness of a male and female of the species.
- Induced spatial autocorrelation (or 'induced spatial dependence') arises from the species response to the spatial structure of exogenous (external) factors, which are themselves spatially autocorrelated. An example of this would be the winter habitat range of deer, which use conifers for heat retention and forage.

Most ecological data exhibit some degree of spatial autocorrelation, depending on the ecological scale (spatial resolution) of interest. As the spatial arrangement of most ecological data is not random, traditional random population samples tend to overestimate the true value of a variable, or infer significant correlation where there is none. This bias can be corrected through the use of geostatistics and other more statistically advanced models. Regardless of method, the sample size must be appropriate to the scale and the spatial statistical method used in order to be valid.

=== Pattern ===
Spatial patterns, such as the distribution of a species, are the result of either true or induced spatial autocorrelation. In nature, organisms are distributed neither uniformly nor at random. The environment is spatially structured by various ecological processes, which in combination with the behavioral response of species generally results in:

- Gradients (trends): steady directional change in numbers over a specific distance
- Patches (clumps): a relatively uniform and homogenous area separated by gaps
- Noise (random fluctuations): variation not able to be explained by a model

Theoretically, any of these structures may occur at any given scale. Due to the presence of spatial autocorrelation, in nature gradients are generally found at the global level, whereas patches represent intermediate (regional) scales, and noise at local scales.

The analysis of spatial ecological patterns comprises two families of methods:

- Point pattern analysis deals with the distribution of individuals through space, and is used to determine whether the distribution is random. It also describes the type of pattern and draws conclusions on what kind of process created the observed pattern. Quadrat-density and the nearest neighbor methods are the most commonly used statistical methods.
- Surface pattern analysis deals with spatially continuous phenomena. After the spatial distribution of the variables is determined through discrete sampling, statistical methods are used to quantify the magnitude, intensity, and extent of spatial autocorrelation present in the data (such as correlograms, variograms, and periodograms), as well as to map the amount of spatial variation.

== Applications ==
=== Research ===
Analysis of spatial trends has been used to research wildlife management, fire ecology, population ecology, disease ecology, invasive species, marine ecology, and carbon sequestration modeling using the spatial relationships and patterns to determine ecological processes and their effects on the environment. Spatial patterns have different ecosystem functioning in ecology for examples enhanced productive.

=== Interdisciplinary ===
The concepts of spatial ecology are fundamental to understanding the spatial dynamics of population and community ecology. The spatial heterogeneity of populations and communities plays a central role in such ecological theories as succession, adaptation, community stability, competition, predator-prey interactions, parasitism, and epidemics. The rapidly expanding field of landscape ecology utilizes the basic aspects of spatial ecology in its research.

The practical use of spatial ecology concepts is essential to understanding the consequences of fragmentation and habitat loss for wildlife. Understanding the response of a species to a spatial structure provides useful information in regards to biodiversity conservation and habitat restoration.

Spatial ecology modeling uses components of remote sensing and geographical information systems (GIS).

== Statistical tests ==
A number of statistical tests have been developed to study such relations.

=== Tests based on distance ===
==== Clark and Evans' R ====
Clark and Evans in 1954 proposed a test based on the density and distance between organisms. Under the null hypothesis the expected distance ( r_{e} ) between the organisms (measured as the nearest neighbor's distance) with a known constant density ( ρ ) is

$$r_e = \frac { 1 } { 2 \sqrt { \rho } }$$

The difference between the observed ( r_{o} ) and the expected ( r_{e} ) can be tested with a Z test

$$Z = \frac{ r_o - r_e } { SE }$$

$$SE = \frac{ 0.26136 } { \sqrt{ N \rho } }$$

where N is the number of nearest neighbor measurements. For large samples Z is distributed normally. The results are usually reported in the form of a ratio: R = ( r_{o} ) / ( r_{e} )

==== Pielou's α ====
Pielou in 1959 devised a different statistic. She considered instead of the nearest neighbors the distance between an organism and a set of pre-chosen random points within the sampling area, again assuming a constant density. If the population is randomly dispersed in the area these distances will equal the nearest neighbor distances. Let ω be the ratio between the distances from the random points and the distances calculated from the nearest neighbor calculations. The α is

$$\alpha = \pi d \omega$$

where d is the constant common density and π has its usual numerical value. Values of α less than, equal to or greater than 1 indicate uniformity, randomness (a Poisson distribution) or aggregation respectively. Alpha may be tested for a significant deviation from 1 by computing the test statistic

$$\chi^2_{ 2n } = 2 n \alpha$$

where χ^{2} is distributed with 2n degrees of freedom. n here is the number of organisms sampled.

Montford in 1961 showed that when the density is estimated rather than a known constant, this version of alpha tended to overestimate the actual degree of aggregation. He provided a revised formulation which corrects this error. There is a wide range of mathematical problems related to spatial ecological models, relating to spatial patterns and processes associated with chaotic phenomena, bifurcations and instability.

== See also ==
- Edge effects
- Spatial analysis
- Taylor's law
