= Wilhelm Troll =

German botanist (1897–1978)

Julius Georg Hubertus Wilhelm Troll (3 November 1897, Munich – 28 December 1978, Mainz) was a German botanist, known for his studies in the field of plant morphology. He advocated a morphological biology that was rooted in the nature philosophy of Goethe. He was an older brother to geographer Carl Troll (1899–1975).

== Biography ==
From 1919 to 1921, he studied biological sciences at the Ludwig-Maximilians-Universität München, where he was a pupil of botanist Karl Ritter von Goebel. From 1929 to 1930, he participated in the Sunda Expedition der Notgemeinschaft der Deutschen Wissenschaft, during which, he conducted studies on the respiratory roots of mangrove plants. In 1932, he was appointed professor of botany and director of the botanical garden at the University of Halle, and in 1946, he became a professor of botany and general biology at the University of Mainz.

Some plants with the specific epithet of trollii honor his name.

== Selected works ==
- Goethes morphologische schriften, ausgewählt und eingeleitet von Wilhelm Troll. 1932 – Goethe's morphological writings.
- Vergleichende morphologie der höheren pflanzen, 1935 – Comparative morphology of higher plants.
- Gestalt und Urbild : gesammelte Aufsätze zu Grundfragen der organischen Morphologie, 1941 – Shape and archetype: collected essays on basic questions of organic morphology.
- Allgemeine Botanik; ein Lehrbuch auf vergleichend-biologischer Grundlage, 1948 – General botany; a textbook on comparative and biological basics.
- Praktische Einführung in die Pflanzenmorphologie; ein Hilfsbuch für den botanischen Unterricht und für das Selbststudium, 1954 – Practical introduction to plant morphology; an auxiliary book for botanical teaching and self-study.
- Die Infloreszenzen : Typologie und Stellung im Aufbau des Vegetationskörpers, 1964 – Inflorescences: Typology and position involving the structure of the plant body.
