= Human ecosystem =

Human-dominated ecosystems of the anthropocene era

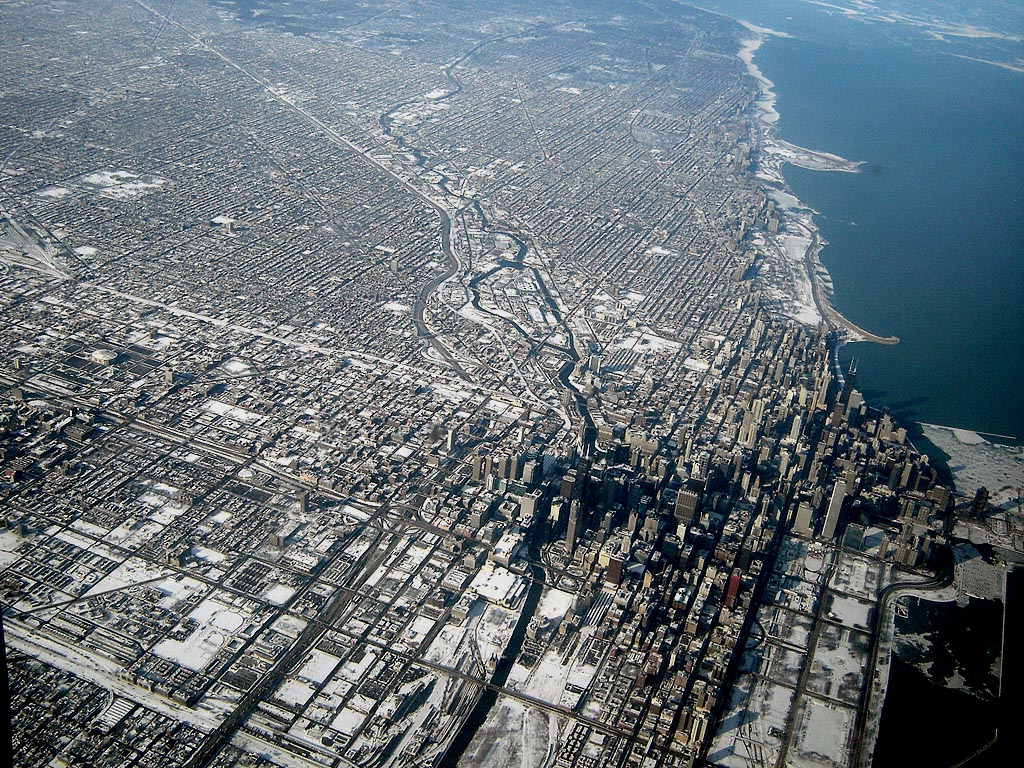
An aerial view of a human ecosystem. Pictured is the city of Chicago

Human ecosystems are human-dominated ecosystems of the Anthropocene era that are viewed as complex cybernetic systems by conceptual models that are increasingly used by ecological anthropologists and other scholars to examine the ecological aspects of human communities in a way that integrates multiple factors such as economics, sociopolitical organization, psychological factors, and physical factors related to the environment.

A human ecosystem has three central organizing concepts: human environed units (an individual or group of individuals), environment, interactions and transactions between and within the components. The total environment in human ecosystems have been described in three components: natural, human-constructed, and human behavioral. While this framework is commonly considered, scholars argue that it reflects an anthropocentric perspective by centering human activity within the environment. Different human communities conceptualize the environment in ways that reflect their individual cultural values with the non-human world. For example, Indigenous scholars such as Kyle Powys Whyte describe the environment not as separate from the human, but as a large network of reciprocal relationships among humans, non-humans, and the land. Expanding its definition to include multiple cultural perspectives can provide a more comprehensive understanding of human ecosystems. Which is important because these environments furnish the resources and conditions necessary for life and constitute a life-support system.

== Systems of power in human ecosystems ==
Human ecosystems are shaped not only by interactions between people and their environments but also by the systems of power that influence how people interact with the environment. These systems affect several facets of human societies such as political, economic, and social structures, all of which determine how individuals and groups of individuals interact within an ecosystem.

Systems of power refers to the organized structures in which power is delegated within society. These systems operate at every level, from local communities to global institutions. And these systems shape not just formal legalities such as laws and economic policies but heavily shape cultural norms and social interactions, which are so deeply ingrained, they become nearly impossible to see. Along with the differences in how systems of power shape society, it's also important to note that power within human ecosystems is not distributed evenly. Power is concentrated with the global elite. And in turn, decisions for the betterment of society are oftentimes for about 20-30% of the global population, at the expense of the rest. Understanding systems of powers can help clarify how human ecosystems function within and with their surrounding environments.

Political systems, such as governments and local authorities, also have an important role within human ecosystems. They regulate things like land usage, environmental policies, and general access to resources. For example, zoning laws and environmental regulations can shape urban development and influence the sustainability of human ecosystems. Specifically, this can be seen in government policies on the dumping of nuclear waste in locations seen as expendable. This has affected large areas of Spokane, Washington State, and the Yakama Reservations.

Social hierarchies, such as class, race, and gender, further influence power dynamics within human ecosystems. These factors create unequal access to both environmental benefits and burdens. Communities with less political or economic power may be disproportionately exposed to environmental burdens such as pollution. For example, there has been much documentation on how marginalized communities are disproportionately affected by infrastructures like landfills, mines, incinerators, and ecologically harmful transportation systems. These communities also experience negative consequences of climate change and pesticide exposure at a larger scale. One specific example of this is from restoration ecologist, Eric Krieg, “Communities where people of color make up 25% or more of the total population average nearly five times as many pounds of chemical emissions from polluting industrial facilities per square mile as compared to communities where less than 5% of the population are people of color”.

== Environmental justice ==
Environmental justice is a concept that examines the fair distribution of environmental benefits and burdens, particularly with respect to marginalized communities. Within human ecosystems, environmental justice is concerned with how a myriad of factors can influence who has access to things like clean air and water and how environmental risks like pollution are unevenly distributed among human populations.

In many human ecosystems, environmental injustice is closely linked to already existing social structures. Communities with lower income levels or less political influence are often more likely to experience exposure to environmental hazards. This can be seen with gold mining in Kalimantan, Indonesia. This area largely homes low-income communities who work in these mines. It has been found that approximately 1/3 of global anthropogenic emissions have been released into the environment from this location, leading to environmental degradation and lower quality of living for the people that live in Kalimantan. These burdens are frequently the result of historical social foundations, such as discriminatory policies, which shape how human ecosystems evolve over time.

Environmental injustice can have significant effects on the health and well-being of communities within a human ecosystem. Limited access to environmental resources and increased exposure to environmental hazards can contribute to long-term issues. Communities facing environmental injustice are often exposed to higher levels of pollution, which has been associated with increased rates of respiratory illnesses, cardiovascular disease, and many other chronic health problems. This inadequate access to resources can further worsen overall quality of life. An example of this is with the Catalao Floating Community. As the demand for AI data centers has risen, there has been an increasing lack of drinking water for this community. As a direct result of not having fresh water, the community has had to put up with precarious sanitation, water contamination and unstable energy supplies, all things that have overall lowered the community's quality of life.

Beyond the individual health impacts, environmental injustice can affect the resilience of whole communities. When disadvantaged communities are burdened with these environmental risks, their ability to respond to any additional difficulties like environmental disasters is also affected. An example of this was with Flint, Michigan, the population there did not have the means or political power to fight back/protest the lead contaminated water and so they were unable to respond to the issue effectively. Understanding environmental justice is important in studying human ecosystems because it provides insight into how and why environmental outcomes may differ amongst different human populations.

Environmental justice can also be looked at through the lenses of the nonhuman world. Human ecosystems are not just about interactions between human communities, but also between human/communities and the non-human world. The non-human world is oftentimes seen as expendable, a resource to be extracted and used for human benefits. This has led to devastation of land, water, and climate. An example of this is in the American South, where the expanding slave front had left soils overharvested and eroded, waterways polluted, and forests cut down.

== Sociopolitical organization ==
Within human ecosystems, sociopolitical organizations play a central role in controlling environmental resources. Governments have the power to determine how resources like land and water are allocated. An example of this can be seen in Nicaragua, where their central government has complete control over how natural resources are extracted, preserved, and used. While, legally, the central government is required to consider the municipal government's opinion on the allocation/exploitation of natural resources, the central government oftentimes disregards dissenting opinions, as they have the final say on all contracts regarding things like forestry, mining, and fishing exploitation. Structures like the one in Nicaragua can influence the development of environmental policies, which will have a domino effect in affecting sustainability outcomes at local, regional, and global scales. Variations within sociopolitical organization can lead to different approaches to environmental decision-making.

The effects of sociopolitical organization are closely tied to overall systems of power. Differences in social status can shape participation in environmental governance. As a result, some groups may have a greater ability to influence outcomes, while others may be left with the burden of these outcomes with no say; this can be seen again with the community of Flint, Michigan. These organizations have evolved alongside changes in human societies. Early human societies often relied on communal management of shared resources, while the industrialization period and expansion of states introduced formal systems of resource allocation.

Overall, sociopolitical organization is a fundamental component of human ecosystems because it controls the interactions individuals are able to have with ecological processes; by influencing not only how decisions are made. But also, how such decisions are enforced regardless of individual wants and needs.

== Economic systems ==
Economic systems within human ecosystems refer to the structures through which resources are gathered, produced, and then consumed; systems include markets, labor, and consumption styles. An example of this is when critical materials like cobalt are in high demand and are abundant in low-income locations. Due to this, locals who have no other option for work will mine cobalt at dangerous conditions and little pay for the benefit of the global elite. Economic activity is closely linked to ecological systems due to natural resources being the basis of any type of product development. Because of this, they play a central role in extraction and overall interactions with the natural world.

Demand for natural resources may increase extraction, while more regulatory laws can encourage more sustainable efforts. Economic inequality can also affect access to environmental resources and differences in wealth can determine who benefits from resource use and who bears the environmental costs. An example of this is from communities like that of the Standing Rock Sioux Tribe. The U.S. government made the decision to construct the Dakota Access Pipeline, disregarding the environmental risk of oil spills on cultural land and water.

Overall, the effects of economic systems on human communities are tied closely to social organization. Industrial economies have often been the source of resource overconsumption and environmental degradation. At the same time, economic growth can contribute to improving people's access to resources, though such benefits are not distributed evenly. Economic systems are a fundamental component of human ecosystems because they structure how resources are valued. And by influencing patterns of production and consumption, they affect the viability of human communities.

== Psychological and physical factors ==
Human communities are also largely affected by psychological and physical factors. Psychological factors are factors that affect a person's cognitive and emotional responses. These could include their perception of safety, their beliefs about nature and their individual identity. While physical factors refer to environmental conditions like climate and geography.

Together, these factors play an important role in shaping human behavior. For example, communities exposed to extreme environmental conditions will oftentimes develop special cultural practices to survive the environment. The Yolngu people are an example of this. They travel extensively to secure essential resources daily. Another example of this is in the extreme environment of the Hindu Kush, where villages have created rules for things like restricting the number of animals kept and setting dates for a communal transhumance movement. Psychological responses to environmental stress like hunger can also influence decision-making within and between human communities. An example of this is within the Canadian Arctic, it has been noted that there's a high level of interdependence within extended family units and that reciprocity has been necessitated due to lack of resources available.

Historically, psychological and physical environmental factors have had a large effect on the development of human societies. Agricultural communities, like the Aboriginal and Torres Strait Islanders, for example, adapted their beliefs based on seasonal cycles and the land and the knowledge they have of it were their cultural traditions. During the industrialization period, there were altered physical conditions like city style living which brought into new psychological factors like changes in societal norms. An example of these changing social norms is in sustainable living within human ecosystems, such as the growing popularity of vegan/vegetarian diets in Western societies or in increasing norm to recycle. Health standards are also largely affected, as society has moved away from agriculture, there has been a decrease in average height within children due to consumption of products harmful to health and this can increase occurrence of disease.

== See also ==
- Media ecosystem
- Urban ecosystem
- Total human ecosystem
