= Ernst Neef =

German geographer (1908–1984)

Ernst Neef (16 April 1908, in Dresden – 7 July 1984, in Dresden) was a German geographer. Together with Carl Troll (1899–1975) and Josef Schmithüsen (1909–1984), he is considered one of the founders of landscape ecology.

Neef's concept of landscape and landscape ecology can be summarized as follows: "Neef (1956, 1967) holds the classical geographical view that all components of the geosphere exist interdependently at every point on the earth’s surface by virtue of lawful relations (the ‘vertical’ dimension). However, he rejects the classical assumption of natural landscape units, contending instead that landscapes are not objectively given entities. Instead, they are sections within the uninterrupted earth-wide interconnection of geofactors (the ‘horizontal’ dimension) which are defined as such on the basis of their uniformity in terms of a specific land use, and are thus defined in an anthropocentric and relativistic way. Landscape ecology according to the Neef school explores the landscape’s natural potential in terms of functional utility for human societies."

== English publications of Neef ==
- Neef, E. 1967/2007: The theoretical foundations of landscape study. In: Wiens, J.A., Moss, M.R., Turner, M.G. & Mladenoff, D.J. 2007 (Eds): Foundation papers in landscape ecology. New York, Columbia University Press: 225–245. First published in German 1967: Die theoretischen Grundlagen der Landschaftslehre. Gotha, Haack.
- Neef, E. 1982: Stages in the development of landscape ecology. In: Sybrand P. Tjallingii/A. A. de Veer (Eds): Perspectives in landscape ecology. Contributions to research, planning and management of our environment. Proceedings of the International Congress organized by the Netherlands Society for Landscape Ecology, Veldhoven, the Netherlands, April 6–11, 1981, Wageningen: 19-27.
- Neef, E. 1983: Landscapes as the integration field of human regional work. Geol. Mijnbouw 62: 531–534.
- Neef, E. 1984: Applied landscape research. Appl. Geogr. Develop. 24: 38–58.
