= Urban ecosystem =

Structure of civilization

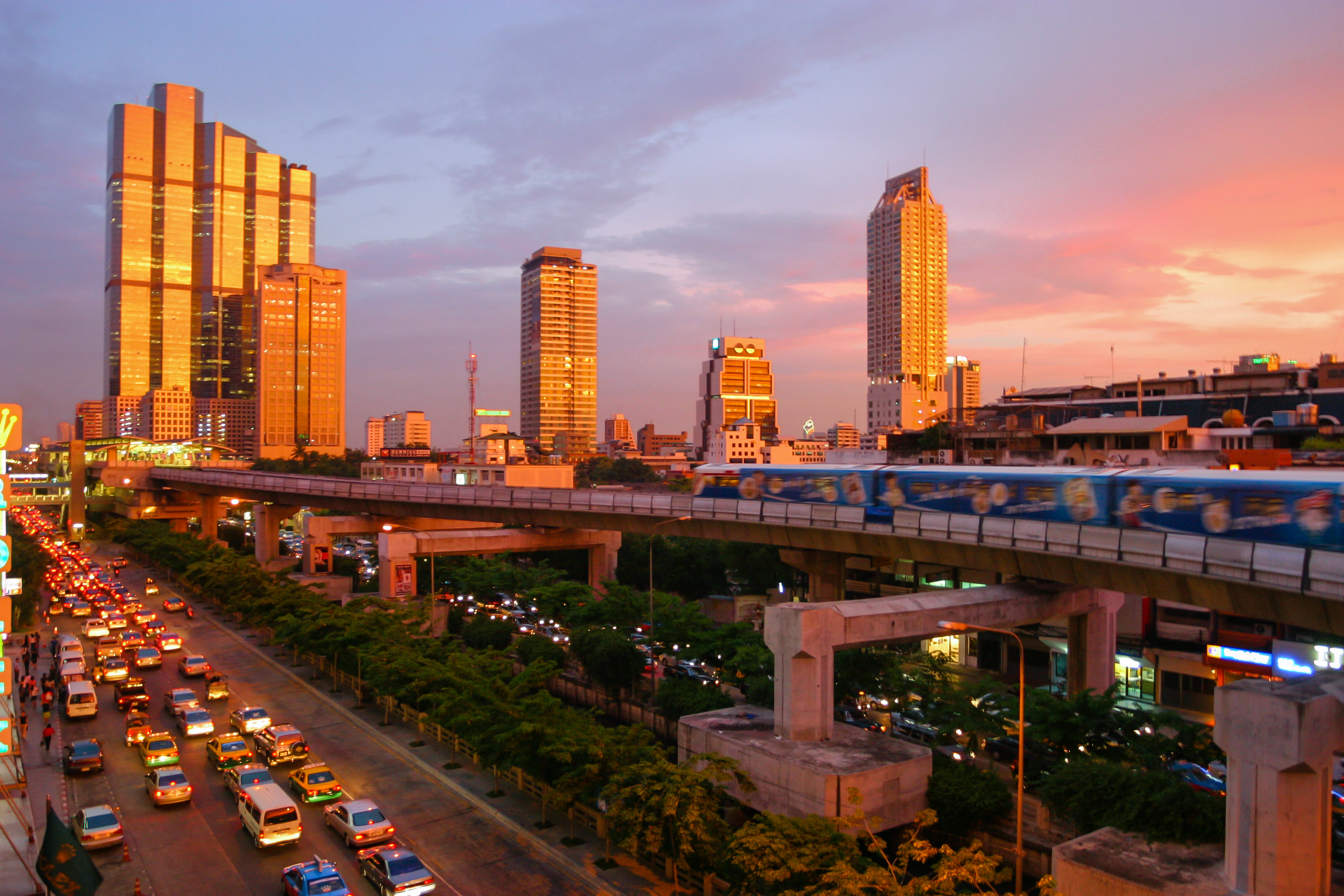
Bangkok, Thailand

In ecology, urban ecosystems are considered an ecosystem functional group within the intensive land-use biome. They are structurally complex ecosystems with highly heterogeneous and dynamic spatial structure that is created and maintained by humans. They include cities, smaller settlements and industrial areas, that are made up of diverse patch types (e.g. buildings, paved surfaces, transport infrastructure, parks and gardens, refuse areas). Urban ecosystems rely on large subsidies of imported water, nutrients, food and other resources. Compared to other natural and artificial ecosystems human population density is high, and their interaction with the different patch types produces emergent properties and complex feedbacks among ecosystem components.

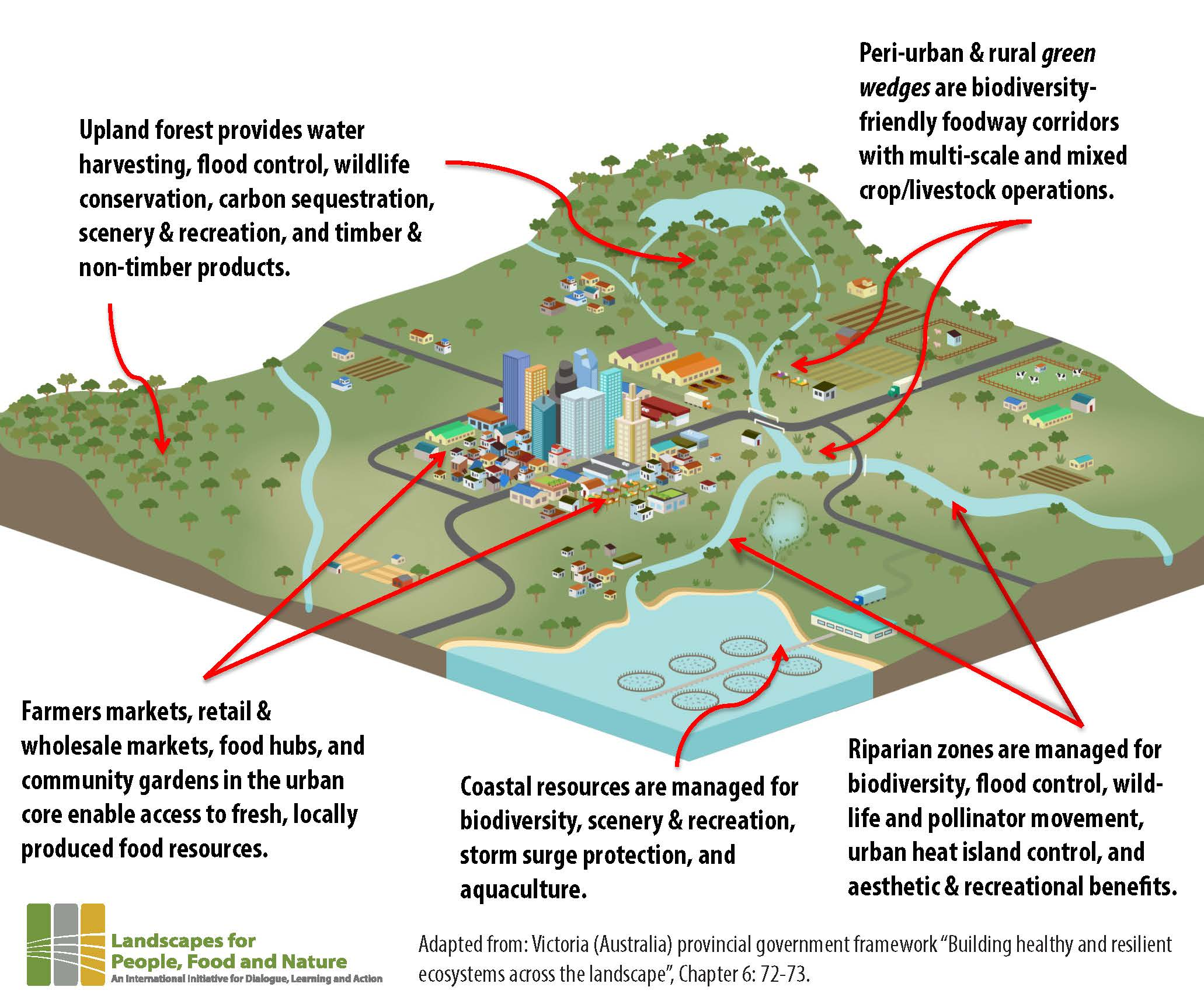
Ecosystem service flows along the urban rural continuum

In socioecology, urban areas are considered part of a broader social-ecological system in which urban landscapes and urban human communities interact with other landscape elements. Urbanization has large impacts on human and environmental health, and the study of urban ecosystems has led to proposals for sustainable urban designs and approaches to development of city fringe areas that can help reduce negative impact on surrounding environments and promote human well-being.

== Urban ecosystem research ==
Urban ecology is a relatively new field. Because of this, the research that has been done in this field has yet to become extensive. While there is still plenty of time for growth in the research of this field, there are some key issues and biases within the current research that still need to be addressed.

The article "A Review of Urban Ecosystem Services: Six Key Challenges for Future Research'' addresses the issue of geographical bias. According to this article, there is a significant geographical bias, "towards the northern hemisphere". The article states that case study research is done primarily in the United States and China. It goes on to explain how future research would benefit from a more geographically diverse array of case studies.

"A Quantitative Review of Urban Ecosystem Service Assessments: Concepts, Models, and Implementation" is an article that gives a comprehensive examination of 217 papers written on Urban Ecosystems to answer the questions of where studies are being done, which types of studies are being done, and to what extent do stakeholders influence these studies. According to this article, "The results indicate that most UES studies have been undertaken in Europe, North America, and China, at city scale. Assessment methods involve bio-physical models, Geographical Information Systems, and valuation, but few study findings have been implemented as land use policy."

"Urban vacancy and land use legacies: A frontier for urban ecological research, design, and planning" is another scholarly article that gives an insight into the future of urban ecological research. It details an important opportunity for the future of urban ecological researchers that only a few researchers have inquired into so far, the utilization of vacant land for the creation of urban ecosystems.

== Difficulties and opportunities ==
=== Difficulties ===
Urban ecosystems are complex and dynamic systems that encompass a wide range of living and nonliving components. These components include humans, plants, animals, buildings, transportation systems, and water and energy infrastructure. As the world becomes increasingly urbanized, understanding urban ecosystems and how they function is becoming increasingly important.

==== Population growth ====
Cities are home to more than half of the world's population, and the number of people living in urban areas is expected to continue to grow in the coming decades. This rapid urbanization can have both positive and negative impacts. On the one hand, cities can provide economic opportunities, access to healthcare and education, and a high quality of life for residents. On the other, increased urbanization exacerbates the struggles of pollution, loss of green spaces, loss of biodiversity, and more.

==== Pollution ====
In many cities, air pollution levels are well above safe limits, and this can have serious implications for human health. Pollution from vehicles, factories, and power plants can cause respiratory problems, heart disease, and even cancer. In addition to its impact on human health, air pollution can also damage buildings, corrode infrastructure, and harm plant and animal life.

==== Dissolution of green spaces as a public resource ====
As cities grow, natural areas such as forests, wetlands, and grasslands are often replaced by buildings, roads, and other forms of development. Lack of urban green spaces contribute to a reduction in air/water quality, mental and physical health of residents, energy efficiency, and biodiversity.

==== Habitat fragmentation and loss of species diversity ====
Related to the dissolution of green space, habitat fragmentation refers to the way in which green spaces get divided by urban development, making it impossible for some species to migrate between. The process, referred to as Genetic Drift, is essential to maintaining the genetic diversity needed for species survival.

Species diversity is also impacted by the introduction of non-native and invasive species from travel and shipping processes. Research has found that heavily urbanized areas have a higher richness of invasive species when compared to rural communities. While not all non-native or invasive species are inherently detrimental to a city, invasives can out-compete essential native species, cause biotic homogenization, and introduce new vectors for new diseases.

==== Urban heat lands ====
Urban Heat Island (UHI) refers to the variation in average temperature that occurs within an urban area due to current methods of development. Patterns in UHIs cause disproportionate impacts of climate change, often creating extra burdens for the already vulnerable. Extreme heat events, which occur more frequently in UHIs, can and do result in deaths, cardiopulmonary diseases, reduced capacity for outdoor labor, mental health concerns, and kidney disease. The demographics most vulnerable to the negative impacts of UHIs are senior citizens, and those without resources to cool off, such as air conditioners.

==== Disease ====
Currently methods of urban development increase the risk of disease proliferation within cities as compared to rural environments. Urban traits that contribute to higher risk are poor housing conditions, contaminated water supplies, frequent travel in and out, survival success of rats, and intense population density that causes rapid spread and rapid evolution of the disease.

=== Opportunities ===
==== Green and blue infrastructure ====
Green and blue infrastructure refers to methods of development that work to integrate natural systems and human made structures. Green Infrastructure includes land conservation, such as nature preserves, and increased vegetation cover, such as vertical gardens. Blue infrastructure would include stormwater management efforts such as bioswales. The process of LEED certification can be used to establish green infrastructure practices in individual buildings. Buildings with LEED certification status report 30% less energy used and economic and mental benefits from natural lighting.

==== Public cities and walkable design ====
Beginning in earnest during the 1960, city planning in terms of transit centered around individual car use. Today, cars are still the most dominant form of transportation in urban areas. One effective solution is an improvement to public transportation. Expanding bus or train routes and switching to clean energy use address the issues of air quality, noise pollution, and socioeconomic equity.

Another opportunity to reduce carbon emissions and increase population health would be the implementation of the walkable city model in urban planning. A walkable city is strategically planned to reduce distance traveled in order to access resources needed such as food and jobs.

==== Improving research ====
As new urban ecosystems installations take place, the research done for these projects will continue to improve and become more beneficial. Researches have been working to develop stronger tools that map and analyze ecosystem services, which include water regulation, cooling of air, and water purification. These advancements in technology help planners visualize the relationship between the natural environment and its direct urban environment.

There have also been further collaborations between ecologists, engineers, and urban planners to ensure the strategies being used are the most practical and eco-friendly. Through the use of analysis and collaboration, it is possible for future research to promote evidence-based decisions that prioritize sustainability.

== Bibliography ==
- Gibson, R.B., Alexander, D.H.M., & Tomalty, R. (1997). "Putting cities in their place: Ecosystem-based planning for Canadian urban regions". In M. Roseland (ed.). Eco-city dimensions: Healthy communities, healthy planet. Gabriola Island, B.C.: New Society. pp. 25–39. hdl:10613/2758. ISBN 978-0-86571-353-6.
- Manfredi Nicoletti, L'Ecosistema Urbano (The Urban Ecosystem), Dedalo Bari 1978
- Maes, Mikaël J. A., et al. (2019). Mapping Synergies and Trade-Offs between Urban Ecosystems and the Sustainable Development Goals. Environmental Science & Policy, 93, 181-188.
- Neuenkamp, Lena, et al. (2021). Special Issue: Urban Ecosystems: Potentials, Challenges, and Solutions. Basic & Applied Ecology, 56, 281-288.
- Nilon, C. H., Aronson, M. F., Cilliers, S. S., Dobbs, C., Frazee, L. J., Goddard, M. A., & Yocom, K. P. (2017). Planning for the future of urban biodiversity: A global review of city-scale initiatives. BioScience, 67(4), 332-342.
- Colombo, Enea, et al. "Smartification from Pilot Projects to New Trends in Urban Ecosystems." 2022 IEEE International Smart Cities Conference (ISC2), Smart Cities Conference (ISC2), 2022 IEEE International, September 2022, pp. 1–7. EBSCOhost.
- Kourdounouli, Christina, and Anna Maria Jönsson. "Urban Ecosystem Conditions and Ecosystem Services – a Comparison between Large Urban Zones and City Cores in the EU." Journal of Environmental Planning and Management BECC: Biodiversity and Ecosystem Services in a Changing Climate, vol. 63, no. 5, January 2020, pp. 798–817. EBSCOhost

== See also ==
- Ecosystem
- Human ecosystem
- Media ecosystem
- Urban planning
- Urban ecology
