= Friedrich Ludwig (painter) =

German painter

Friedrich Ludwig (1895–1970) was a German expressionist painter. He created art using oil paint, chalk, gouache, and watercolor paints.

== Early life ==
Friedrich Ludwig was the ninth oldest child in his family; he had sixteen siblings. His family farmed in Wieslet, in the Black Forest region of Southern Germany. From 1901–1909, he attended elementary school in Schopfheim. He completed an apprenticeship for painting and decorating in the same town. From 1913 to 1917, he worked as a decorator in Zurich, Switzerland. In 1917, he joined the German military, although he identified as a pacifist.

== Artistic career ==
In 1920 Ludwig joined the "Badenweiler Kreis", which was a group of like-minded people; the group's notable members included Thomas Mann, Annette Kolg, and Alfred Krupp. In 1922, Ludwig traveled to Italy and viewed the work of Piero della Francesca; this work left a lasting impression. From 1922 to 1926 Ludwig studied at the Städel school in Frankfurt.

In 1926 Ludwig was accepted at the prestigious Académie Julian in Paris; it is known for educating Cézanne, Gauguin, Émile Bernard, Maurice Denis, Pierre Bonnard, Eduard Vuillard, Maillol, and Achille Laugé.

From 1928 to 1930, Ludwig was surrounded Parisian artists, this is considered Ludwig's most creative period.

In 1931, Ludwig went to Bad Reichenhall, Bavaria, to focus on inner peace. During this time, he mainly depicted nature and landscapes in his artwork.

His first official exhibition in 1934 in Munich was forbidden by the Nazi official Adolf Wagner, who described it as "in an un-German manner". The National Socialist Party considered him to be a degenerate and forbid him from painting.

In 1935, the gallery "Neupert" in Zurich offered to host an exhibition of Ludwig's work. Although the exhibition was successful, he rejected an offer to remain in Switzerland; instead he traveled to Bellinzona, the Adria, Paris, over Wieslet and back to Bad Reichenhall, where he settled down in 1940. Here he created his series of paintings called, "The Blue Mountains". Created from 1938–1941, the series shows blue mountains located in Upper Bavaria.

After the surrender of the Third Reich in 1945, the Americans granted Ludwig permission to resume painting; he moved to Berchtesgaden, Bavaria.

In 1956 Ludwig exhibited two of his works in Munich, along with the group "Blauer Reiter". In 1957, he had his first comprehensive exhibit at Karin Hielscher, a gallery in Munich. This consisted of 45 works, almost all of which were sold. During this time, Ludwig met several times with Reinhard Mueller Mehlis, an art critic and historian. In 1958, he had a second exhibition at Karin Hielscher; all of his works presented were sold. In 1964, his third exhibition, consisting of 27 works, were presented in Munich; all of his works were sold.

In 1965 he exhibited at the "Regensburger Gallery".

== Personal life ==
In 1941, Ludwig married Berta Stumm, the daughter of a lawyer; in 1949 they divorced.

On 27 December 1954, Ludwig married Christel Sprengel, and in 1955 his son Michael was born. In 1959, his wife left him and moved with their son to Piding, Bavaria.

In 1965, Christel Sprengel expressed concerns about Ludwig's mental health in a letter to Swiss art historian Werner Mueller; she stated that Ludwig was confused and emotionally absent. On 31 July 1968, he was admitted to the mental hospital Gabersee in close proximity to Wasserburg, Inn. In 1968, his son Michael committed suicide at the age of thirteen. Friedrich Ludwig died at a hospital in Gabersee on 22 January 1970. He was buried in Piding beside his son.

== Works ==
Ludwig, who was mentally ill, claimed to have burned all of his works causing him to almost be forgotten. However, in 1984, Sigurd Marien, a lawyer and an art collector, purchased a baroque closet that contained some of Ludwig's paintings.

In 1999, the Friedrich Ludwig Museum, in his hometown of Wieslet, was founded under the direction of Dr. Viardot. The museum holds approximately 2,000 of Ludwig's works. In 2012, the museum closed in order to focus on archiving all of his known works.

The record price for his artwork was set in 2013, when his painting, Zwei Mädchen, sold for US$7,873.

== Quotes ==
=== About Friedrich Ludwig ===
- "In his pictures, intangible spirit beings can ascend. Tilting and refractions contain symbol of suggested figures, patterns, faces. Cutting shapes jutting into the picture have something transitory and unfest. His single figures are substantially more compact. Spatial width and sculptural volumes formed the cause for a multiplicity of pictures, which testify for Ludwig in the European art of the time after Cézanne beside the German expressionist the own way of the outsider: a colorist of high degrees, whose discovery is to be retrieved now" (Reinhard Mueller-Mehlis).
- "Ludwig was a spirited and extremely mobile, genuine and inspirable artist," remembers the Zurich art historian Dr. Werner Y. Mueller: "A born painter, only in color dreams lived and like a child at the colored miracle of the things was pleased again and again."
