= Landscape limnology =

Spatially explicit study of lakes, streams, and wetlands as they interact with landscapes

Landscape limnology is the spatially explicit study of lakes, streams, and wetlands as they interact with freshwater, terrestrial, and human landscapes to determine the effects of pattern on ecosystem processes across temporal and spatial scales. Limnology is the study of inland water bodies inclusive of rivers, lakes, and wetlands; landscape limnology seeks to integrate all of these ecosystem types.

The terrestrial component represents spatial hierarchies of landscape features that influence which materials, whether solutes or organisms, are transported to aquatic systems; aquatic connections represent how these materials are transported; and human activities reflect features that influence how these materials are transported as well as their quantity and temporal dynamics.

Bremigan. 2009. The lake landscape-context framework: linking aquatic connections, terrestrial features and human effects at multiple spatial scales.

Verhandlungen Internationale Vereinigung für theoretische und angewandte Limnologie. 30:695-700

== Foundation ==
The core principles or themes of landscape ecology provide the foundation for landscape limnology. These ideas can be synthesized into a set of four landscape ecology themes that are broadly applicable to any aquatic ecosystem type, and that consider the unique features of such ecosystems.

A landscape limnology framework begins with the premise of Thienemann (1925). Wiens (2002): freshwater ecosystems can be considered patches. As such, the location of these patches and their placement relative to other elements of the landscape is important to the ecosystems and their processes. Therefore, the four main themes of landscape limnology are:

1. Patch characteristics: The characteristics of a freshwater ecosystem include its physical morphometry, chemical, and biological features, as well as its boundaries. These boundaries are often more easily defined for aquatic ecosystems than for terrestrial ecosystems (e.g., shoreline, riparian zones, and emergent vegetation zone) and are often a focal point for important ecosystem processes linking terrestrial and aquatic components.
2. Patch context: The freshwater ecosystem is embedded in a complex terrestrial mosaic (e.g., soils, geology, and land use/cover) that has been shown to drive many within-ecosystem features and processes such as water chemistry, species richness, and primary and secondary productivity.
3. Patch connectivity and directionality: The complex freshwater mosaic is connected to the particular patch of interest and defines the degree to which materials and organisms move across the landscape through freshwater connections. For freshwater ecosystems, these connections often display a strong directionality component that must be explicitly considered. For example, a specific wetland can be connected through groundwater to other wetlands or lakes, or through surface water connections directly to lakes and rivers, or both, and the directionality of those connections will strongly impact the movement of nutrients and biota.
4. Spatial scale and hierarchy: Interactions among terrestrial and freshwater elements occur at multiple spatial scales that must be considered hierarchically. The explicit integration of hierarchy into landscape limnology is important because (a) many freshwater ecosystems are hierarchically organized and controlled by processes that are hierarchically organized, (b) most freshwater ecosystems are managed at multiple spatial scales, from policy set at the national level, to land management conducted at local scales, and (c) the degree of homogeneity among freshwater ecosystems can change in relation to the scale of observation.

== Contributions to other fields ==
Findings from landscape limnology research are contributing to many facets of aquatic ecosystem research, management, and conservation. Landscape limnology is especially relevant for geographical areas with thousands of ecosystems (i.e. lake-rich regions of the world), in situations with a range of human disturbances, or when considering lakes, streams, and wetlands that are connected to other such ecosystems.

For example, landscape limnology perspectives have contributed to the development of nutrient criteria for lakes, formation of classification systems that can be used to monitor the health of aquatic ecosystems, understanding ecosystem responses to environmental stressors, or explaining biogeographic patterns of community composition.

== See also ==
- Deposition (geology)
- Ecology
- Ecoregions
- Landscape ecology
- Limnology
