= Total human ecosystem =

Total human ecosystem (THE) is an ecocentric concept initially proposed by ecology professors Zeev Naveh and Arthur S. Lieberman in 1994.

== History of the concept ==
Naveh and Lieberman proposed a holistic, ecocentric concept of the total human ecosystem in order to study anthropocene ecology and improve land use planning and environmental management within an integrated and interdisciplinary approach. In Naveh's words, the total human ecosystem is "the highest co-evolutionary ecological entity on earth with landscapes as its concrete three-dimensional ‘Gestalt’ systems, forming the spatial and functional matrix for all organisms". This concept (or meta-concept) integrates human systems (the technosphere, but also in the conceptual space of human noosphere) and natural systems (the geophysical eco-space of the Earth biosphere).

Zev Naveh (1919-2011), the major contributor to this concept, was a professor in landscape ecology at the Technion, Israel Institute of Technology, Haifa. Until 1965 he worked as a range and pasture specialist in Israel and Tanzania. His research at the Technion was devoted to human impacts on Mediterranean landscapes, fire ecology and dynamic conservation management, and the introduction of drought resistant plants for multi-beneficial landscape restoration and beautification.

Almo Farina, who also developed the concept from 2000 onwards, is also a professor of ecology at the Urbino University, Faculty of Environmental Sciences, in Italy.

== Concepts and epistemology ==
The interaction and co-evolution of the human and natural ecosystem interactions are the driving forces for the current Earth system. The total human ecosystem meta-conceptual approach aims to integrate the bio-and geo-centric approaches, derived from the natural sciences, and the approaches derived from the social sciences and the humanities in order to prevent further environmental degradation and drive natural and human systems towards a sustainable future.

A natural ecosystem within this concept is solar energy powered, self-organizing and self-creating. The human ecosystem is fossil energy powered by high input and throughput, and can be divided into two sub-ecosystems: urban-industrial and agro-industrial. The ecosystem is realised in space as an ecotope and the system of ecotopes is the landscape: natural, semi-natural, urban-industrial are the tangible, three-dimensional physical systems. These form the total human ecosystem. The total human ecosystem also consists of the domain of information, perceptions (in landscape ecology this is the ecofield concept), knowledge, feeling and consciousness, enabling human (but also biological) self-awareness.

A special case of landscapes inside the total human ecosystem are the cultural landscapes in which the relationships between human activity (as an effective, ecology-based, land or sea stewardship) have created ecological, socioeconomic and cultural patterns and feedback mechanisms that preserve biological and cultural diversity and maintain or even improve the ecosystem's resilience and resistance.

== See also ==
- Human ecosystem
- Landscape ecology
- Environmental geography
- Ecosystem
- Sustainability
