= Gabersee =

Town borough in Wasserburg

- Ortsteil of Wasserburg am Inn
- Interactive map of Gabersee
- Location within Germany Location within Bavaria
- Coordinates: 48°03′35″N 12°12′12″E
- Country: Germany
- State: Bavaria
- Admin. region: Oberbayern
- District: Rosenheim
- Town: Wasserburg am Inn
- Elevation: 487 m (1,598 ft)

Population (2012)
  - Total: 347
- Time zone: UTC+01:00 (CET)
  - Summer (DST): UTC+02:00 (CEST)
- Postal codes: 83512
- Dialling codes: 08071
- Vehicle registration: RO, AIB, WS
- Website: www.wasserburg.de

Gabersee is a borough of the town Wasserburg am Inn in the Rosenheim district of Bavaria in Germany. Gabersee is notable for its psychiatric hospital that was used for a euthanasia programme during Nazi Germany and was used as a post-World War II displaced person camp in the American sector before it reopened in 1953 resuming normal activity.

== The Hospital ==
In response to the social problems caused by industrialization and mass society, a lot of social facilities were established towards the end of the 19th century, to take in mentally ill and disabled people, provide them with appropriate accommodation and, if possible, cure them.

After all six mayor social facilities in the upper-bavarian district were overcrowded around 1880, the district bought the property "Gut Gabersee" in 1882 and built a psychiatric clinic with a capacity of 500 patients a year later. The building was designed by architect Johann Rieperdinger. It was specially designed to support therapies with extensive patient occupation. The building (also called "Koloniale Anstalt"), which is located in a park-like setting, was functionally self-sufficient and relatively hygienic for the time. It had a neo-roman church was finished in 1893. In 1902, the number of patients reached ca. 500, which led to it being further expanded in 1908. In 1929, the clinic was renamed "Simons'sche Arbeitstherapie".

=== In Nazi Germany (1933–1945) ===
During the rule of the Nazi Party, psychiatric clinics underwent major changes because of Aktion T4. In 1940, selections for euthanasia preparations began, leading to the deportation and murder of 542 patients in the Hartheim killing facility. The institution was dissolved in 1941, with remaining patients transferred to Eglfing-Haar, where many succumbed to neglect or overmedication.

=== Post-War (1945–present) ===
After the Second World War during the American occupation zone, the clinic was used as a displaced persons camp for Jewish survivors. Here, and in another former euthanasia camp in Attel (today another borough of Wasserburg) around 2000 Jewish persons from Poland, Hungary, Romania and Czechoslovakia were housed between 1946 and 1950. At first, the survivors were in bad physical and psychic shape and, as nurse and holocaust survivor Hadassah Bimko Rosensaft said, were "freed from the clutches of death, no longer afraid of death, but we were not free to live without fear." Yet, most of the people rehabilitated. Although the camp was under de-jure control of the United Nations Relief and Rehabilitation Administration (UNRRA), the US-Government gave it so much sovereignty that it functioned as a de-facto independent municipality. Thus, the annually elected camp chairman worked like a mayor.

After the military occupation of Germany ended, the camp ceased operations in 1950 and most of the Jews moved to the US, Canada, Australia or Israel, the most popular destination, despite being only created two years ago. Those who did not have the option of emigration moved to other camps that were still operating, such as in Feldafing, Lechfeld und Föhrenwald, the latter running until February 1957. (see: Föhrenwald camp). After the closure of the last camp, the last 800 people were split amongst nine Jewish communities throughout Germany, whereas Munich took at least the half of them.

In 1953, the repaired facilities reopened as the "Nervenkrankenhaus des Bezirks Oberbayern." Over the years, the hospital evolved, with modernizations, expansions, and restructuring. Today, as part of the kbo-Inn-Salzach-Klinikum, it stands as a leading institution in psychiatry, psychotherapy, psychosomatic medicine, geriatrics, and neurology.

Historical population figures of the borough
Year	1871	1925	1950	1970	1987	2008	2012
Population	20	934	196	1318	490	311	347

== Notable people ==
- It is the birthplace of Carl Troll in 1899
- The psychiatric hospital is where Friedrich Ludwig died in 1970.

== Literature ==
- Braun, Nikolaus (2012). Die Heil- und Pflegeanstalt Gabersee in der Zeit des Nationalsozialismus (1933-1941) (PDF) (in German). ISBN 978-3-943911-03-9 – via wasserburg.de.
