= Carl Troll =

German geographer (1899–1975)

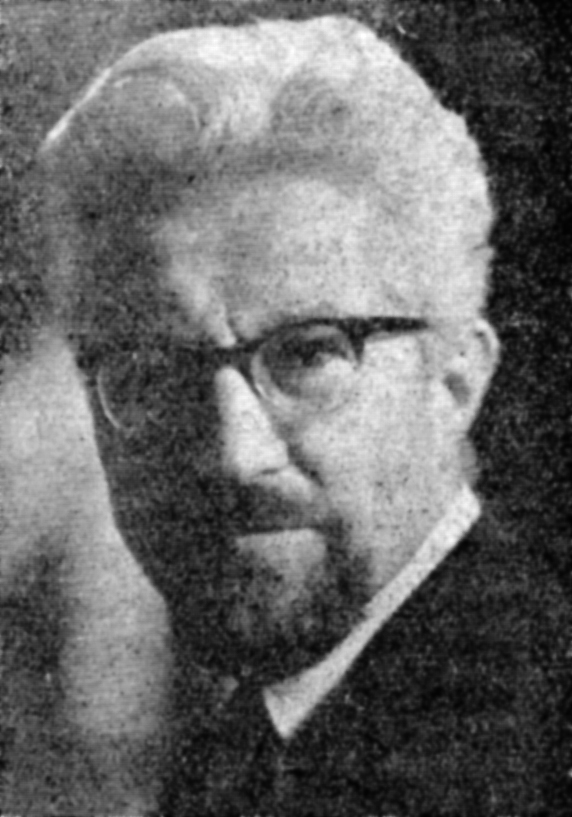
- Born: 24 December 1899; Gabersee, German Empire
- Died: 21 July 1975 (aged 75); Bonn, West Germany
- Citizenship: Germany, West Germany
- Education: Ludwig-Maximilians-Universität München
- Awards: Vega Medal (1951); Victoria Medal (1962); Albrecht-Penck-Medaille (1964)
- Scientific career
- Fields: Climatology; Geography; Landscape ecology

Carl Troll (24 December 1899 in Gabersee – 21 July 1975 in Bonn) was a German geographer, brother of botanist Wilhelm Troll. From 1919 until 1922 Troll studied biology, chemistry, geology, geography and physics at the Ludwig-Maximilians-Universität München. In 1921, he obtained his doctorate in botany and in 1925 his habilitation in geography. Between 1922 and 1927 he worked as an assistant at the Geography Institute at the Ludwig-Maximilians-Universität München. Troll was engaged in research in the ecology and geography of mountainous lands: between 1926 and 1929 went on a research journey throughout South American Andean countries where he visited northern Chile, Bolivia, Peru, Ecuador, Colombia, and Panama. In 1933 and 1934 his research interests took him to East and South Africa; in 1937 Troll was in Ethiopia; and in 1954 he visited Mexico.

In 1930, he became professor of colonial and overseas geography in Berlin, and in 1938 professor of geography in Bonn. Troll, who utilised aerial photographs in his research, coined the term Landscape ecology in 1939. He developed this terminology and many early concepts of landscape ecology and of high mountain ecology and geography as part of his early work applying aerial photographs interpretation to studies of interactions between environment and vegetation and from his research travels in the mountainous regions of Asia, Africa and South America, as well as his native Europe. He developed seasonal climatic charts and three-dimensional climatic classification from hydrological, biological and economical data.

Carl Troll was president of the International Geographical Union from 1960 to 1964.

== Andean research ==
Compared to other scientists of the first half of the 20th century, Troll's Andean work stands out by being free of developmentalist thought and there is "no evidence of triumphalism of Western science in his Andean work". Vertical zonation is the most acclaimed part of Troll's work in the Andes building upon the work of Alexander von Humboldt.

=== The Inca Empire and the environment ===
Carl Troll argued that the development of the Inca state in the central Andes was aided by conditions that allows for the elaboration of the staple food chuño. Chuño, which can be stored for long times, is made of potato dried at freezing temperatures that are common at nighttime in the southern Peruvian highlands. Contradicting the link between the Inca state and chuño is that other crops such as maize can also be with dried only sun. Troll did also argue that llamas, the Inca's pack animal, can be found in its largest numbers in this very same region. It is worth considering the maximum extent of the Inca Empire roughly coincided with the greatest distribution of alpacas and llamas in Pre-Hispanic America. The link between the Andean biomes of puna and páramo, pastoralism and the Inca state is a matter of research. As a third point Troll pointed out irrigation technology as advantageous to the Inca state-building. While Troll theorized environmental influences on the Inca Empire he opposed environmental determinism arguing that culture lay at the core of the Inca civilization.
