= Jean Paelinck =

Belgian economist and academic (1930–2025)

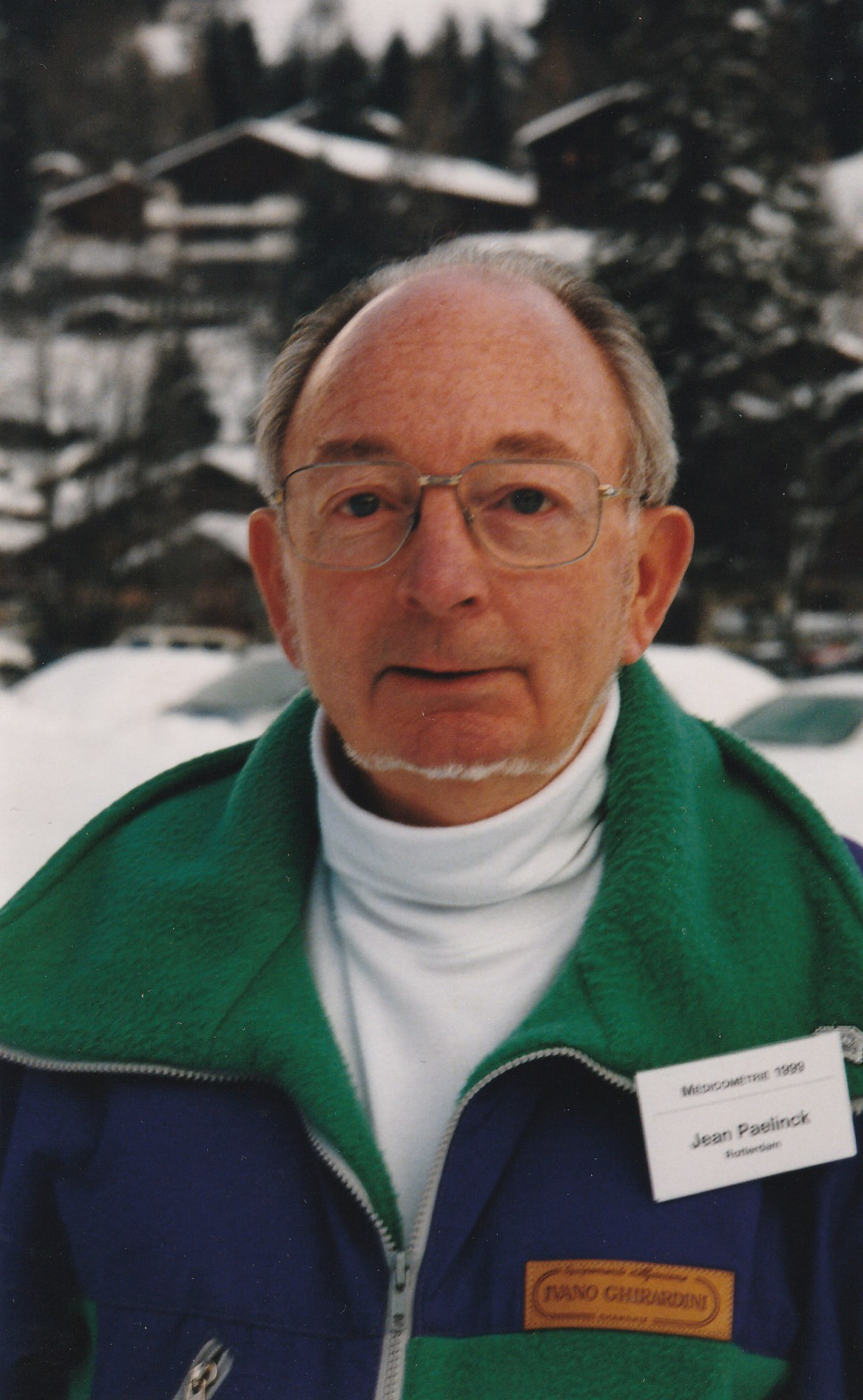
Paelinck in 1999

Jean Henri Paul Paelinck (4 July 1930 – 18 April 2025) was a Belgian economist and Distinguished Service Professor in the Schar School of Policy and Government at George Mason University. He was known for his work in econometrics, and he coined the term "spatial econometrics" in his address to the Dutch Statistical Association on 2 May 1974.

== Life and career ==
Paelinck was born on 4 July 1930. He earned his Doctor of Law degree maxima cum laude from Belgium's University of Liège in 1953, and his master's degrees from the same institution the following year. He was a research student in the Department of Applied Economics at Cambridge University from 1958 to 1959, where he worked with Richard Stone. He taught at the University of Lille, the University of Namur, and Erasmus University Rotterdam.

Paelinck died on 18 April 2025, at the age of 94.

== Honours and awards ==
In 2014, the Regional Science Association International (RSAI) created the Jean Paelinck Award in Regional Science in honor of Paelinck, who was one of the organization's four founding fellows. Paelinck was named a Knight of the Order of the Netherlands Lion in 1994, and received the RSAI Founder's Medal in 1996.
