= Spatial econometrics =

Subfield of spatial analysis and econometrics

Spatial econometrics is the field where spatial analysis and econometrics intersect. The term “spatial econometrics” was introduced for the first time by the Belgian economist Jean Paelinck (universally recognised as the father of the discipline) in the general address he delivered to the annual meeting of the Dutch Statistical Association in May 1974 (Paelinck and Klaassen, 1979). In general, econometrics differs from other branches of statistics in focusing on theoretical models, whose parameters are estimated using regression analysis. Spatial econometrics is a refinement of this, where either the theoretical model involves interactions between different entities, or the data observations are not truly independent. Thus, models incorporating spatial auto-correlation or neighborhood effects can be estimated using spatial econometric methods. Such models are common in regional science, real estate economics, education economics, housing market and many others. Adopting a more general view, in the by-law of the Spatial Econometrics Association, the discipline is defined as the set of “models and theoretical instruments of spatial statistics and spatial data analysis to analyse various economic effects such as externalities, interactions, spatial concentration and many others” (Spatial Econometrics Association, 2006). Recent developments tend to include also methods and models from social network econometrics.

== History ==
The first general text in the field was the 1979 book by Paelinck and Klaasen.

== See also ==
- Geographic information science
- Spatial autocorrelation
- Complete spatial randomness
- Modifiable areal unit problem
- Spatial analysis
- Correlation
- Regression analysis
