= On Human Nature =

1978 book by E. O. Wilson

- Cover of the first edition
- Author: E. O. Wilson
- Language: English
- Subject: Human nature
- Publisher: Harvard University Press
- Publication date: 1978
- Publication place: United States
- Media type: Print (Hardcover and Paperback)
- Pages: 288
- Award: Pulitzer Prize (1979)
- ISBN: 0-674-01638-6
- OCLC: 55534964
- Dewey Decimal: 304.5 22
- LC Class: GN365.9 .W54 2004

On Human Nature (1978; second edition 2004) is a book by the biologist E. O. Wilson, in which the author attempts to explain human nature and society through sociobiology. Wilson argues that evolution has left its traces on characteristics such as generosity, self-sacrifice, worship and the use of sex for pleasure, and proposes a sociobiological explanation of homosexuality.

He attempts to complete the Darwinian revolution by bringing biological thought into social sciences and humanities. Wilson describes On Human Nature as a sequel to his earlier books The Insect Societies (1971) and Sociobiology: The New Synthesis (1975).

The book won the Pulitzer Prize in 1979.

== Summary ==
=== 2004 Preface ===
The conundrum of human nature, as I and a few others saw it in 1978, can be solved only if scientific explanations embrace both the how (neurosciences) and why (evolutionary biology) of brain action, with the two axes of explanation fitted together. In The Insect Societies (1971), I proposed that a coherent branch of biology might be constructed from a synthesis of social behavior and population biology. In 1975 I expanded the conception of the discipline outlined to include vertebrate animals. The result was Sociobiology: The New Synthesis, a double-column, 697-page account of theory based on an encyclopedic review of all known social organisms. In a 1989 poll the officers and fellows of the international Animal Behavior Society ranked it the most important book on animal behavior of all time. Many scientists and others believed it would have been better if I had stopped before the last chapter on Homo sapiens. There could not have been a worse time than the mid-1970s for the inauguration of human sociobiology. The Vietnam War had created a student protest movement of the revolutionary left. Race was a radioactive issue. Talk of the inheritance of IQ and human behavior were punishable offenses. The blank-slate interpretation of the brain sheltered the social sciences and humanities from the storms of biology and vouchsafed their independence as two of the three great branches of learning. In the popular media, sociobiology came to mean the theory that human behavior is determined by genes. The final chapter of Sociobiology should have been a book-length exposition.

=== Chapter 1. Dilemmas ===
As a species we have no particular place to go. Human emotional responses have been programmed to a substantial degree by natural selection over thousands of generations but which should be obeyed and which ones might be better curtailed? And how do the different disciplines that explore human nature interact? Those working at a lower level often assume that those at a higher level should eventually be reformulated in their own terms: they form an antidiscipline for the next level, but with the passage of time they become fully complementary. Reduction is only half the scientific process: the recognition of novel emergent phenomena is as important.

=== Chapter 2. Heredity ===
Sociobiology is a hybrid discipline that incorporates knowledge from ethology to derive the principles of the biological properties of entire societies. It attempts to view humanity simultaneously with an array of other social experiments. Societies are not infinitely malleable. We share certain traits with the majority of great apes and monkeys, however less with birds or rodents. And there are a huge number of social traits that occur in every human society. He examines the similarities and differences with chimpanzees in more detail. He then discusses the incest taboo (cultural) with possible underlying genetic explanations. There is no reason to suppose that all genetic variability for behavior has been exhausted. In fact the opposite is true. The chapter concludes with a discussion of identical twin studies and possible racial differences.

=== Chapter 3. Development ===
Is the wiring diagram of the brain of a newborn baby an all-purpose device, adaptable through learning to any mode of social existence as those who believe in a tabula rasa assume? Does sociobiology imply that development is deterministic, producing insect-like behavior? His view is that genetic factors act as a set of biases in development, nudging it one way or another with a potentially large cumulative change. He comments on Chomsky's view of grammar and Skinner's of learning, and prefers Piaget’s approach. The mind isn't a tabula rasa but rather an autonomous decision-making instrument.

=== Chapter 4. Emergence ===
The threat to our free will is that someone may be able to calculate exactly how our brain works. But the extraordinary complexity and difficulty of exact measurement may mean that that is never the case. The cardinal mystery of neurobiology is not self-love or dreams of immortality, but intentionality. The compromise between Russian dolls and vitalism lies in recognizing plans, or schemata. These can create patterns in the mind that aren't altogether present in reality and can form the physical basis of will. Yet our behavior is determined in a weaker sense: we can make broad predictions with confidence. Cultural evolution is Lamarckian and much faster than Darwinian. But culture cannot diverge too far from its biological base. For example, slavery has existed in much of history but humans ultimately refuse to act like slave ants. We need to bear in mind the typical behaviors of people in the last few million years. But with the emergence of Homo sapiens, brain size increase leveled off being replaced by cultural expansion.

=== Chapter 5. Aggression ===
Humans are innately aggressive. Even the most peaceful tribes have a more violent past and probably future. But the Freudian concept of an innate aggressive drive, adapted by Konrad Lorenz, is incorrect. Wilson identifies seven types of situation in which aggression occurs, such as territorialism. But people are also capable of learning from their mistakes and changing, as happened to the Maoris in New Zealand.

=== Chapter 6. Sex ===
Sex has evolved because it creates diversity which can cope with a changing environment. The differing roles of the two sexes creates a conflict of interest which varies between species. But how far are the observed cultural differences innate or environmental? Some indication is given by considering the effects of hormone treatments during pregnancy and the equal treatment in the kibbutz movement. The theoreticians of Judaism and Christianity have misinterpreted the biological significance of sex, with the insistence that its primary role is procreation, and particularly in its treatment of homosexuals. Homosexuality is common in many species and may be normal in a biological sense as a form of bonding.

=== Chapter 7. Altruism ===
Human cultures value highly those who pay the “ultimate sacrifice”, more than most mammal species and only outperformed by the social insects where kin selection reigns. One needs to distinguish this from “soft-core” altruism where the giver expects something in return. Hard-core altruism is the enemy of civilization. But in humans soft-core altruism has been carried to elaborate extremes. Loyalty to close kin is emotionally important but doesn't always override other issues.

=== Chapter 8. Religion ===
Religion is one of the major categories of behavior undeniably unique to the human species and is above all the process by which individuals are persuaded to subordinate their immediate self-interest to the interests of the group. There is myth: the narratives by which the tribe's special place in the world is explained in rational terms consistent with the listener's understanding of the physical world. Much of contemporary intellectual and political strife is due to the conflict between three great mythologies: Marxism, traditional religion, and scientific materialism.

=== Chapter 9. Hope ===
Which of those mythologies gives us hope for the future? He accepts that the humanisms of Huxley, Pauli and others have achieved less than their purpose. But he still looks to the Promethean spirit of science as a cause of hope.

== Reception ==
The biologist Jerry Coyne accused Wilson of trying to use evolutionary psychology to control social science and social policy in The New Republic, arguing that On Human Nature was similar in this respect to Wilson's subsequent book Consilience (1998) and to the biologist Randy Thornhill and the anthropologist Craig Palmer's A Natural History of Rape (2000).

Bryan Walsh in 2011 named On Human Nature as one of the "100 best and most influential" books written in English since 1923 in Time. He considered Wilson's "real achievement" to be to "show how a sociobiological view of humanity could still have grandeur." The computer scientist Paul Brown in 2018 stated in Skeptical Inquirer that On Human Nature is "still brimful with ideas and insights about who we are, how we got here, and how to get wherever we want to go."

On Human Nature was discussed by Gregory Hanlon in the Journal of Interdisciplinary History. Hanlon credited Wilson with helping to establish that human behavior could not be understood solely in terms of "learned cultural values", that the behavioral sciences could help to explain "the interpersonal actions in past societies." He compared the book to the ethnologist Irenäus Eibl-Eibesfeldt's Human Ethology (1989) and the historian Daniel Lord Smail's Deep History and the Brain (2008).

The anthropologist Sarah Blaffer Hrdy argued that a reading of On Human Nature refutes the accusation that Wilson aims to use sociobiology to reinforce traditional sex roles. The philosopher Roger Scruton criticized Wilson's sociobiological explanations of human social behavior, arguing that because of Wilson's "polemical purpose" he was forced to oversimplify the facts. However, he granted that sociobiological explanations of the sort favored by Wilson might possibly be correct. The anthropologist Donald E. Brown commented that he at first failed to read Wilson's book because his views were still conditioned by the "sociocultural perspectives" in which he had been trained. However, Brown concluded that "sociobiologists might be more convincing if they confined their explanations to universals rather than attempting to show that virtually everything that humans do somehow maximizes their reproductive success."

Science writers John Gribbin and Mary Gribbin described On Human Nature as an "accessible account of the application of sociobiology to people". The sociologist Ullica Segerstråle described On Human Nature as essentially a development of Wilson's earlier ideas. She commented that, unlike opponents of sociobiology, Wilson saw it as having liberal political implications, and tried to develop these suggestions in On Human Nature. The psychologist David P. Barash and Ilona A. Barash called On Human Nature, "A wide-ranging, thoughtful, and controversial classic of human sociobiology".

On Human Nature won a 1979 Pulitzer Prize.

== See also ==
- Biology and sexual orientation
- On Aggression
- The Two Cultures
- The Social Conquest of Earth
