= Rescue effect =

Ecological phenomenon

The rescue effect is a phenomenon which was first described by Brown and Kodric-Brown, and is commonly used in metapopulation dynamics and many other disciplines in ecology. This populational process explains how the migration of individuals can increase the persistence of small isolated populations by helping to stabilize a metapopulation, thus reducing the chances of extinction. In other words, immigration can lead to the recolonization of previously extinct patches, promoting the long-term persistence of the network of populations.

== Inner mechanics ==
The rescue effect is remarkably important in areas where the persistence of a species is threatened because of the increasing rates of habitat destruction and fragmentation. If the distributional extent of a species is reduced because of its habitat destruction, the migration rate will decrease producing a decline in the abundance of another population (of the same species) whose patch has been unaltered. This is a clear example, of how the reduction or elimination of interpatch movement and consequently the lack of the rescue effect, is directly related with the abundance and patch occupancy of a species.

The same consequences on the abundance and distribution can be observed when different landscapes or patches are unconnected because of the lack of wildlife corridors. Also the opposite situation can be observed when the rate of immigration per patch increases as the proportion of patches that are occupied increases, resulting in a positive relation between local abundance and the number of occupied patches.

Consequently, metapopulation dynamics and landscape connectivity for the persistence of populations in fragmented landscapes are important factors to take into account when managing endangered species.

== Relations with other theories and phenomena ==
The rescue effect is a common influence on many island populations, even if it seems not obvious due to their apparent lack of connection with the mainland. Nevertheless, a common principle applicable to any island, states that: whenever immigration rates are sufficiently high relative to extinction rates, islands that are closer to sources of dispersing species will have higher immigration rates, and hence lower extinction and turnover rates than more isolated islands.

On the other hand, if immigration and colonization rates are low relative to extinction rates, meaning more individuals of a population die comparing to the newly arrived ones, the rescue effect is small. It can also be concluded that the insular isolation should be inversely related to the turnover rate of the population inhabiting the island.

Therefore it can be concluded that recolonization by conspecifics is an important mechanism, enabling some species to persist on islands. This is particularly true in species that represent early stages in insular taxon cycles and are characterized by species-area curves of shallow slope.

Also a common sense concept linked to the chances of an effective rescue effect on islands, is the size of the island itself. This is called the ‘target‐area effect’, and it states that:The larger the area of the island the more likely a colonization is, either of active or passive immigrants.

=== Rescue effect and dispersal movements ===
Another common principle relating both with the rescue effect and the previously commented insular biogeography is the dispersal capabilities of a species. The rescue effect will be increased by the tendency, for those species that are good dispersers and hence have high immigration rates.

=== Rescue effect and fitness ===
A reduction in the fitness (biology) of a population is a direct consequence of its low diversity which is dependent on the expression of deleterious recessive alleles. In large populations, natural selection keeps such alleles at a low frequency. Since they usually occur in heterozygotes, they are masked by a copy of “normal alleles”. But in small populations, due to the inbreeding, this deleterious alleles can drift to high frequencies and become expressed in homozygotes.

This homozygous (inbred) individuals often have lower chances of surviving and fecundity; reduced fitness. The natural process of migration, acts as a rescue effect by counteracting the fixation of the deleterious alleles and increasing the number of heterozygotes by importing novel alleles from other populations.

This means that immigrants make a positive contribution to fitness over and above the demographic effects of simply adding more individuals, by bringing novel alleles to the population.

This rescue effect is most likely to occur if the recipient population is small, isolated, and suffering from inbreeding depression.

=== Rescue effect and environmental fluctuations ===
The effectiveness of rescue effect reducing the extinction risk via dispersal also depends on the correlation of environmental fluctuations experienced by different populations. If the correlation is high, all populations decline simultaneously reducing recolonization rates of empty patches. This means that if an environmental phenomena diminishes the distributions or abundances of many populations over a large geographical area at the same time, the probabilities of a rescue effect are very low.

== Positive consequences ==
Some of this previously explained concepts can be very valuable and applicable when managing populations. In addition to human mediated dispersal through reintroduction and translocation, the dispersal of individuals (consequently promoting the rescue effect) can be ensured by restoring and conserving the habitat lying between existing populations, sometimes called the landscape matrix (term often used in landscape ecology).

== Negative consequences ==
Increased connectivity may also have anti rescue effects when the spread of disease, parasites or predators is favored. Also, gene flow can sometimes reduce local adaptation. With the arrival of new individuals (immigrants) contributing with their new genetic variability the genetic differentiation of insular population can be delayed or prevented, not allowing the adaptation of the population to their new habitat.

Evidence has been found supporting the idea that the evolution of genetically distinct insular populations represents an entry into the taxon cycle, leading to the extinction of the insular endemic populations.
