= The Social Conquest of Earth =

2012 book by Edward O. Wilson

- Cover of the first edition
- Author: E. O. Wilson
- Language: English
- Publisher: Liveright
- Publication date: 2012
- Publication place: United States
- Media type: Print (Hardcover and Paperback)
- Pages: 352
- ISBN: 978-0871403636
- Followed by: The Meaning of Human Existence (2014)

The Social Conquest of Earth is a 2012 book by biologist Edward O. Wilson.

Wilson adapted the title of Paul Gauguin's famous mural as a theme – "What are we?", "Where did we come from?", "Where are we going?" — for discussing his topic of eusocial behavior in several arthropod taxa and a few mammalian species, and its role in making humans as a species unique.

Wilson argues, building on the paper "The evolution of eusociality" (2010) by Wilson, Martin Nowak and Corina Tarnita in Nature, for the importance of group selection and against the idea of kin selection.

== Reception ==
The Nature article was controversial, with many experts arguing against its conclusions, including an "outraged response" later in the same journal by 137 authors. Richard Dawkins wrote a harshly critical review for Prospect, in which he stated that Wilson had earlier supported Bill Hamilton's theory of kin selection but had, over the years, moved away from it, to the point where it was debatable that he had really understood the theory.

The book was given a positive review by Yale psychologist and author Paul Bloom in The New York Times.

The book was listed as on The New York Times Book Review 100 Notable Books of the Year in 2012.

== See also ==
- Sociobiology: The New Synthesis
- On Human Nature
- Darwin's Cathedral
