= Social Darwinism in European and American Thought, 1860–1945 =

1997 book by Mike Hawkins

- Author: Mike Hawkins
- Language: English
- Subject: social darwinism
- Genre: Non-fiction
- Publication date: 1997
- ISBN: 052157434X

Social Darwinism in European and American Thought, 1860–1945 (ISBN 052157434X) is a book by Mike Hawkins published in 1997 on social darwinism. It deals with the rise of Charles Darwin's ideas and their applications to the individual and society following the publication of The Origin of Species. The subject of the book deals with the exploration of Darwin's principles across the political spectrum, from fascism and its well documented usage of Darwinism to the usage by anarchists in the late 19th and early 20th centuries. It attempts to give a firm definition to what Darwinism was and is. Social Darwinism also deals with the modern consequence of Darwin in the form of Sociobiology and Evolutionary Psychology.
