= Naturalist (book) =

1994 autobiography by Edward O. Wilson

- Cover of the first edition
- Author: Edward O. Wilson
- Language: English
- Subject: Autobiography
- Publisher: Island Press
- Publication date: 1994
- Media type: Print
- Pages: 416
- ISBN: 1-55963-288-7
- OCLC: 30625079
- Dewey Decimal: 508/.092 B 20
- LC Class: QH31.W64 A3 1994
- Followed by: In Search of Nature

Naturalist is an autobiography by Edward. O. Wilson, an naturalist, entomologist, and sociobiologist. It was first published in 1994 by Island Press. It is about his childhood and the beginnings of his interest in biology, his work in entomology and myrmecology, his work with biogeography. He writes about several of his writings including his controversial work Sociobiology: The New Synthesis (1975). It was awarded the 1995 Los Angeles Times book prize for Science and Technology publication.

In 2020, a graphic novel version was published, adapted by Jim Ottaviani and C.M. Butzer.
