= Charles J. Lumsden =

Canadian biologist

Charles J. Lumsden (born 1949) is a Canadian biologist in the Department of Medicine and Institute of Medical Science, University of Toronto. He has been an early proponent of sociobiology, looking to our genetic nature to supplement culture in describing what makes us human. He wrote two influential books in collaboration with Edward O. Wilson Genes, Mind and Culture: The Coevolutionary Process. (Harvard University Press, 1981) and Promethean Fire: Reflections on the Origin of Mind (Harvard University Press, 1983). Part of his interests lies in the mathematical and philosophical bases of physical theory in biology, and the origins of creativity. He has also co-edited biology textbooks, notably Physical Theory in Biology: Foundations and Explorations 1997.
