= Naturalist (disambiguation) =

Naturalist may refer to:

- Practitioner of naturalistic observation or natural history
- Conservation movement member
- Advocate of naturalism (philosophy)
- Naturalist (book), autobiography

== See also ==
- The American Naturalist, periodical
- Naturalism (disambiguation)
- Naturism, cultural and political movement advocating and defending social nudity in private and in public
