= Letters to a Young Scientist =

Book by Edward Osborne Wilson

- Cover of the first edition
- Author: Edward O. Wilson
- Language: English
- Publisher: Liveright
- Publication date: 2013
- Media type: Print
- Pages: 256
- ISBN: 978-0871403858

Letters to a Young Scientist is a 2013 non-fiction book by E. O. Wilson. Included is the observation that one does not need to be brilliant at math to become a great scientist.
