= Sociobiology Study Group =

Academic organization

The Sociobiology Study Group was an academic organization formed to specifically counter sociobiological explanations of human behavior, particularly those expounded by the Harvard entomologist E. O. Wilson in Sociobiology: The New Synthesis (1975). The group formed in Boston, Massachusetts and consisted of both professors and students, predominantly left-wing and Marxist.

Members of the Sociobiology Study Group included Richard C. Lewontin (geneticist, Harvard University), Stephen Jay Gould (paleontologist, Harvard University), Jon Beckwith (Harvard Medical School), Stephan Chorover (psychologist, MIT), David Culver (biologist, Northwestern University), Ruth Hubbard (biologist, Harvard University), Anthony Leeds (anthropologist, Boston University), Margaret Duncan (research assistant, Harvard Medical School), Hiroshi Inouye (resident fellow, Harvard Medical School), Chuck Madansky (graduate student, Harvard Medical School), Lawrence G. Miller (medical student, Harvard Medical School) Miriam Rosenthal (research associate, Harvard School of Public Health), Reed Pyeritz (doctor, Peter Bent Brigham Hospital), and Herb Schreier (psychiatrist, Massachusetts General Hospital).

The Sociobiology Study Group later associated itself with the Boston chapter of Science for the People, thereby forming a larger coalition "The Sociobiology Study Group of Science for the People." The group met monthly, and often held meetings at Harvard lecture halls and in the homes of its members. The meetings often included guests such as Noam Chomsky and Evelyn Fox Keller.

== AAAS Symposium ==
In February 1978 George Barlow and James Silverberg of the Sociobiology Study Group organized a two-day symposium at the American Association for the Advancement of Science (AAAS) in Washington D.C. The proceedings included approximately twenty speakers, and included both advocates and critics alike. Speakers included such scientists as Richard Dawkins, Stephen Jay Gould, E. O. Wilson, and David Barash. The talks were later published into the book Sociobiology: Beyond Nature/Nurture? (1980).

== See also ==
- Nature versus nurture controversy
- British Society for Social Responsibility in Science
- Science wars
