= Colonisation (biology) =

Spread of a species to new areas

Diagram showing bacteria growing and forming into a biofilm on a surface

Colonisation or colonization is the spread and development of an organism in a new locality or habitat. Colonization comprises the physical arrival of a species in a new area, but also its successful establishment within the local community. In ecology, it is represented by the symbol λ (lowercase lambda) to denote the long-term intrinsic growth rate of a population.

Surrounding theories and applicable process have been introduced below. These include dispersal, colonisation-competition trade off and prominent examples that have been previously studied.

One classic scientific model in biogeography posits that a species must continue to colonize new areas through its life cycle (called a taxon cycle) in order to persist. Accordingly, colonisation and extinction are key components of island biogeography, a theory that has many applications in ecology, such as metapopulations. Another factor included in this scientific model is the competition-colonisation trade off. This idea goes into the driving factors of colonisation through many species that all share a need to expand.

== Scale ==
Colonisation occurs on several scales. In the most basic form, as biofilm in the formation of communities of microorganisms on surfaces. This microbiological colonisation also takes place within each animal or plant and is called microbiome. In small scales such as colonising new sites, perhaps as a result of environmental change. And on larger scales where a species expands its range to encompass new areas. This can be through a series of small encroachments, such as in woody plant encroachment, or by long-distance dispersal. The term range expansion is also used.

== Dispersal ==
Dispersion in biology is the dissemination, or scattering, of organisms over periods within a given area or over the Earth. The dispersion of species into new locations can be inspired by many causes. Oftentimes species naturally disperse due to physiological adaptations which allows for a higher survival rate of progeny in new ecosystems. Other times these driving factors are environmentally related, for example global warming, disease, competition, predation. Dispersion of different species can come in many forms. Some prime examples of this is flight of species across long distances, wind dispersal of plant and fungi progeny, long distance of travel in packs, etc.

== Competition–colonisation trade-off ==
The competition–colonisation trade-off refers to a driving factor that has a large influence over diversity and how it is maintained in a community. This is considered a driving factor because all species have to make a decision to entertain competition with others in the community or disperse from the community in hopes of a better environment. This can span from available nutrient sources, light exposure, oxygen availability, reproduction competition, etc. These trade offs are critical in the explanation of colonisation and why it happens.

1. Bare rock 2. New species introduced 3. Death and accumulation of top soil 4. New species introduction displacing pioneer species 5. More nutrients and soil accumulation creates opportunities for larger species colonisation

== Use ==
The term is generally only used to refer to the spread of a species into new areas by natural means, as opposed to unnatural introduction or translocation by humans, which may lead to invasive species.

== Colonisation events ==
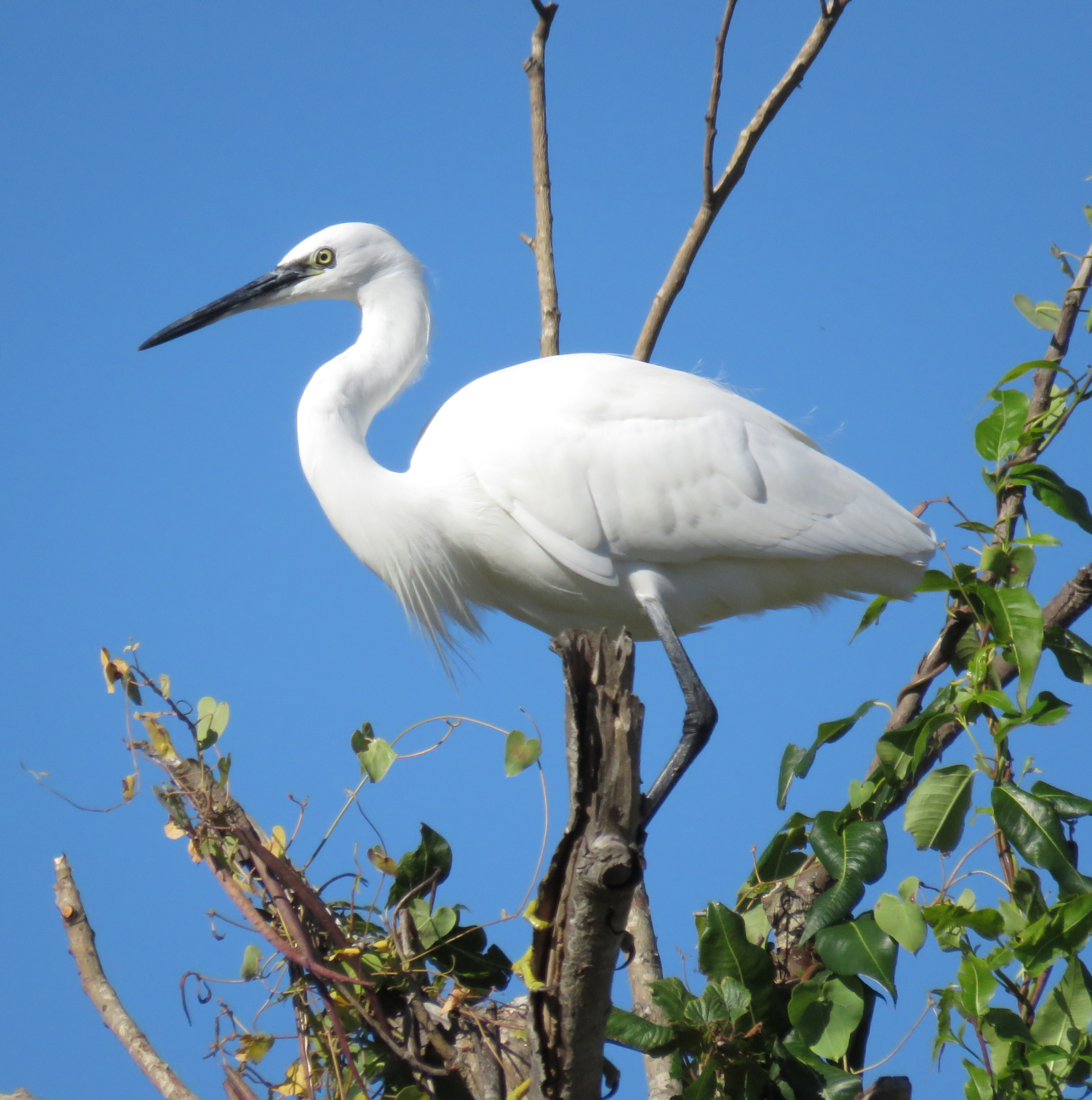
The range of the little egret (Egretta garzetta) has expanded since the 20th century, with the species having colonised most of the New World.

Large-scale notable pre-historic colonisation events include:

=== Arthropods ===
- the colonisation of the Earth's land by the first animals, the arthropods. The first fossils of land animals come from millipedes. These were seen about 450 million years ago.

=== Humans ===
- the early human migration and colonisation of areas outside Africa according to the recent African origin paradigm, resulting in the extinction of Pleistocene megafauna, although the role of humans in this event is controversial.

=== Birds ===
- the colonisation of the New World by the cattle egret and the little egret
- the colonisation of Britain by the little egret
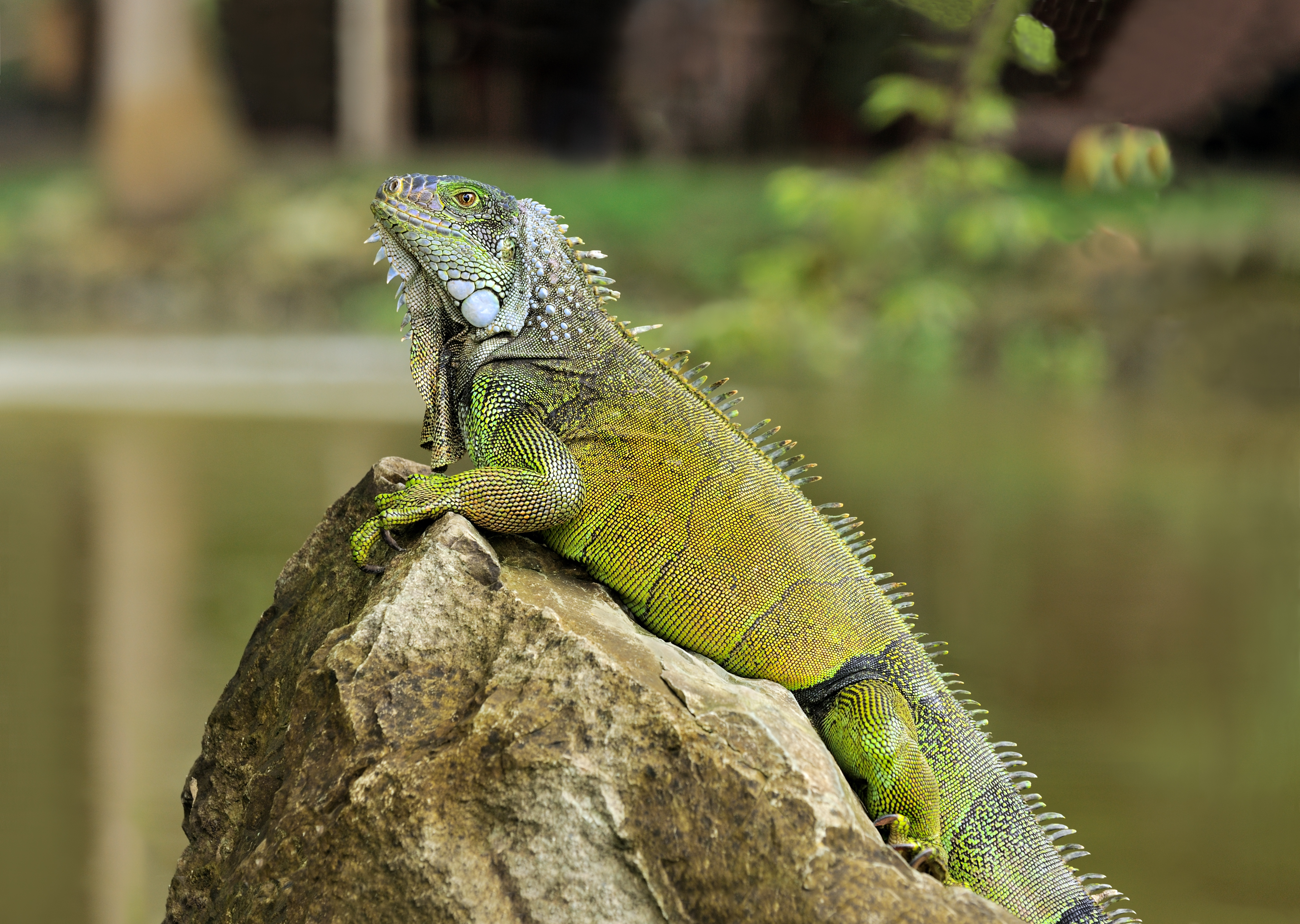
- Image of the green Iguana that colonized Anguilla.
  the colonisation of western North America by the barred owl
- the colonisation of the East Coast of North America by the Brewer's blackbird
- the colonisation-westwards spread across Europe of the collared dove
- the spread across the eastern USA of the house finch
- the expansion into the southern and western areas of South Africa by the Hadeda Ibis

=== Reptiles ===
- the colonisation of Anguilla by Green iguanas following a rafting event in 1995
- the colonisation of Burmese pythons into the Florida Everglades. The release of snakes came from the desire to breed them and sell them as exotic pets. As they grew people became unable to care for the animals and began to release them into the Everglades.

=== Dragonflies ===
- the colonisation of Britain by the small red-eyed damselfly

=== Moths ===
- the colonisation of Britain by Blair's shoulder-knot

=== Land vertebrates ===
- The colonisation of Madagascar by land-bound vertebrates.

=== Plants ===
- The colonisation of Pinus species through wind dispersion.

== See also ==
- Adventive plant
- Colony (biology)
- Invasive species
- Pioneer species
