= E. O. Wilson =

American biologist, naturalist, and writer (1929–2021)

E. O. Wilson ForMemRS
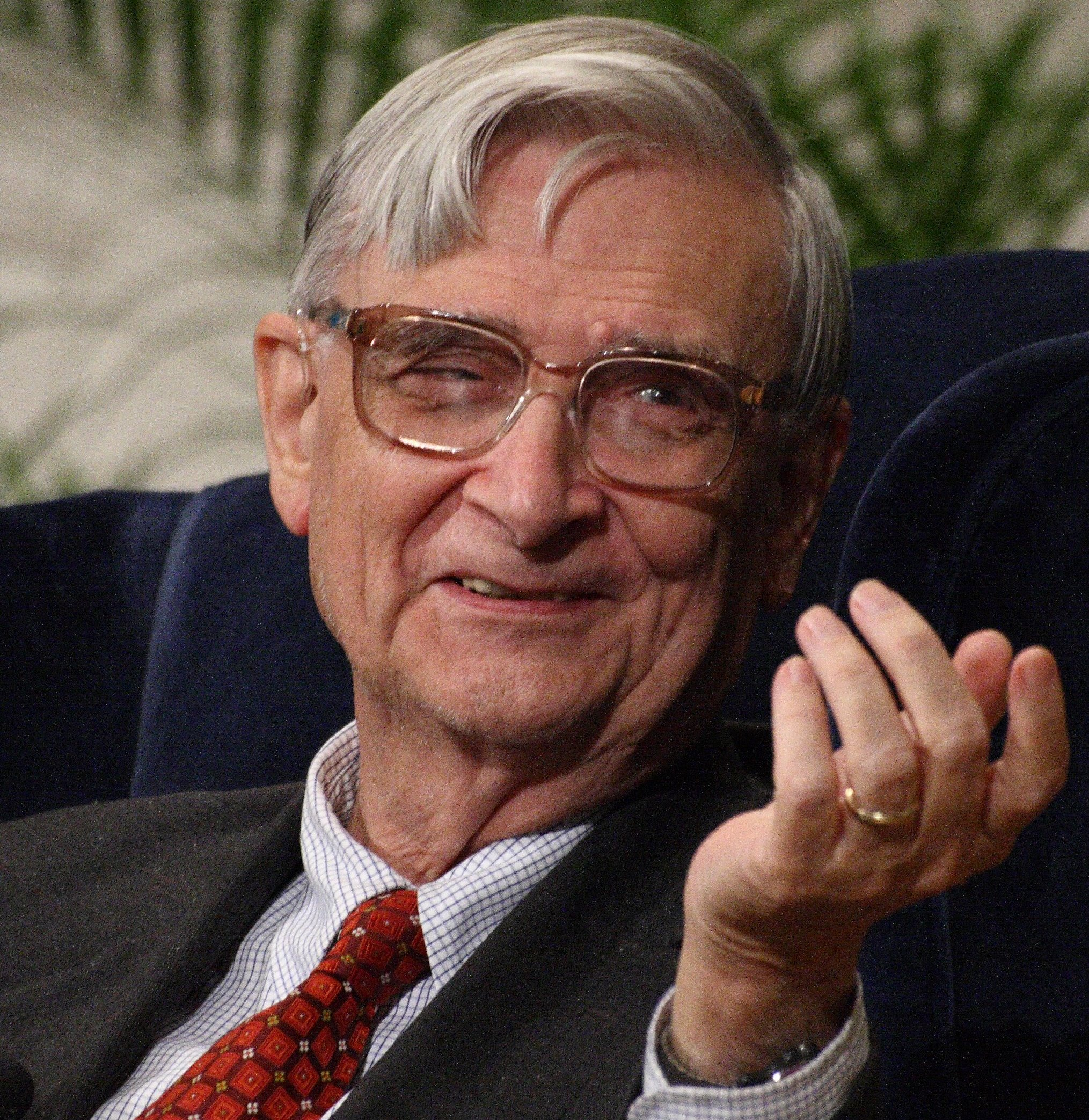
- Wilson in 2007
- Born: Edward Osborne Wilson; June 10, 1929; Birmingham, Alabama, US
- Died: December 26, 2021 (aged 92); Burlington, Massachusetts, US
- Education: University of Alabama (BS, MS); Harvard University (PhD)
- Known for: Sociobiology; Island biogeography; Epic of evolution; Character displacement; Biophilia hypothesis; Taxon cycle
- Spouse: Irene Kelley (m. 1955)
- Awards: Newcomb Cleveland Prize (1967); National Medal of Science (1977); Leidy Award (1979); Pulitzer Prize (1979); Tyler Prize for Environmental Achievement (1984); Crafoord Prize (1990); Pulitzer Prize (1991); International Prize for Biology (1993); Carl Sagan Award for Public Understanding of Science (1994); Kistler Prize (2000); King Faisal Prize (2000); Global Environmental Citizen Award (2001); Nierenberg Prize (2001); BBVA Foundation Frontiers of Knowledge Award in Ecology and Conservation Biology (2010); International Cosmos Prize (2012); Kew International Medal (2014)
- Scientific career
- Fields: Entomology; Myrmecology
- Workplaces: Harvard University; Museum of Natural History
- Thesis: A Monographic Revision of the Ant Genus Lasius (1955)
- Doctoral advisor: Frank M. Carpenter
- Doctoral students: Margaret A. Dix (1968); Daniel Simberloff (1969); Donald J. Farish (1970); James D. Weinrich (1976); Mark W. Moffett (1987)

Edward Osborne Wilson (June 10, 1929 – December 26, 2021) was an American biologist, naturalist, ecologist, and entomologist who developed the field of sociobiology.

Born in Alabama, Wilson found an early interest in nature and frequented the outdoors. At age seven, he was partially blinded in a fishing accident; due to his reduced sight, Wilson resolved to study entomology. After graduating from the University of Alabama, he earned his doctorate at Harvard University, where he distinguished himself in multiple fields. In 1956, he co-authored a paper defining the theory of character displacement. In 1967, he developed the theory of island biogeography with Robert MacArthur.

Wilson was the Pellegrino University Research Professor Emeritus in Entomology for the Department of Organismic and Evolutionary Biology at Harvard University, a lecturer at Duke University, and a fellow of the Committee for Skeptical Inquiry. The Royal Swedish Academy awarded Wilson the Crafoord Prize. He was a humanist laureate of the International Academy of Humanism. He was a two-time winner of the Pulitzer Prize for General Nonfiction (for On Human Nature in 1979, and The Ants in 1991) and a New York Times bestselling author for The Social Conquest of Earth, Letters to a Young Scientist, and The Meaning of Human Existence.

Wilson's work received both praise and criticism during his lifetime. His 1975 book Sociobiology: The New Synthesis was a particular flashpoint for controversy, and drew criticism from the Sociobiology Study Group. Wilson's interpretation of the theory of evolution resulted in a widely reported dispute with Richard Dawkins about multilevel selection theory. Examinations of his letters after his death revealed that he had supported the psychologist J. Philippe Rushton, whose work on race and intelligence is widely regarded by the scientific community as deeply flawed and racist.

== Early life, family and education ==
Edward Osborne Wilson was born on June 10, 1929, in Birmingham, Alabama, the only child of Inez Linnette Freeman and Edward Osborne Wilson Sr. According to his autobiography, Naturalist, he was raised in various towns in the Southern US which included Mobile, Decatur, and Pensacola. From an early age, he was interested in natural history. His father was an alcoholic who eventually died by suicide. His parents allowed him to bring home black widow spiders and keep them on the porch. They divorced when he was seven years old.

In the same year that his parents divorced, Wilson blinded himself in his right eye in a fishing accident. Despite the prolonged pain, he did not stop fishing. He did not complain because he was anxious to stay outdoors, and never sought medical treatment. Several months later, his right pupil clouded over with a cataract. He was admitted to Pensacola Hospital to have the lens removed. Wilson writes, in his autobiography, that the "surgery was a terrifying [19th] century ordeal". Wilson retained full sight in his left eye, with a vision of 20/10. The 20/10 vision prompted him to focus on "little things": "I noticed butterflies and ants more than other kids did, and took an interest in them automatically." Although he had lost his stereoscopic vision, he could still see fine print and the hairs on the bodies of small insects. His reduced ability to observe mammals and birds led him to concentrate on insects.

At age nine, Wilson undertook his first expeditions at Rock Creek Park in Washington, D.C. He began to collect insects and he gained a passion for butterflies. He would capture them using nets made with brooms, coat hangers, and cheesecloth bags. Going on these expeditions led to Wilson's fascination with ants. He describes in his autobiography how one day he pulled the bark of a rotting tree away and discovered citronella ants underneath. The worker ants he found were "short, fat, brilliant yellow, and emitted a strong lemony odor". Wilson said the event left a "vivid and lasting impression". He also earned the Eagle Scout award and served as Nature Director of his Boy Scouts summer camp. At age 18, intent on becoming an entomologist, he began by collecting flies, but the shortage of insect pins during World War II caused him to switch to ants, which could be stored in vials. With the encouragement of Marion R. Smith, a myrmecologist from the National Museum of Natural History in Washington, Wilson began a survey of all the ants of Alabama. This study led him to report the first colony of fire ants in the U.S., near the port of Mobile.

Wilson has stated he attended 15 or 16 schools during 11 years of schooling. He was concerned that he might not be able to afford to go to a university, and he tried to enlist in the US Army, intending to earn federal government financial support for his education. He failed the Army medical examination due to his impaired eyesight, but he was able to afford enroll at the University of Alabama, where he earned his Bachelor of Science in 1949 and Master of Science in biology in 1950. The next year, Wilson transferred to Harvard University.

Appointed to the Harvard Society of Fellows, he traveled on overseas expeditions, collecting ant species from Cuba and Mexico and traveling the South Pacific, including Australia, New Guinea, Fiji, and New Caledonia, as well as to Sri Lanka. In 1955, he received his Ph.D. and married Irene Kelley.

In Letters to a Young Scientist, Wilson stated his IQ was measured as 123.

== Career ==
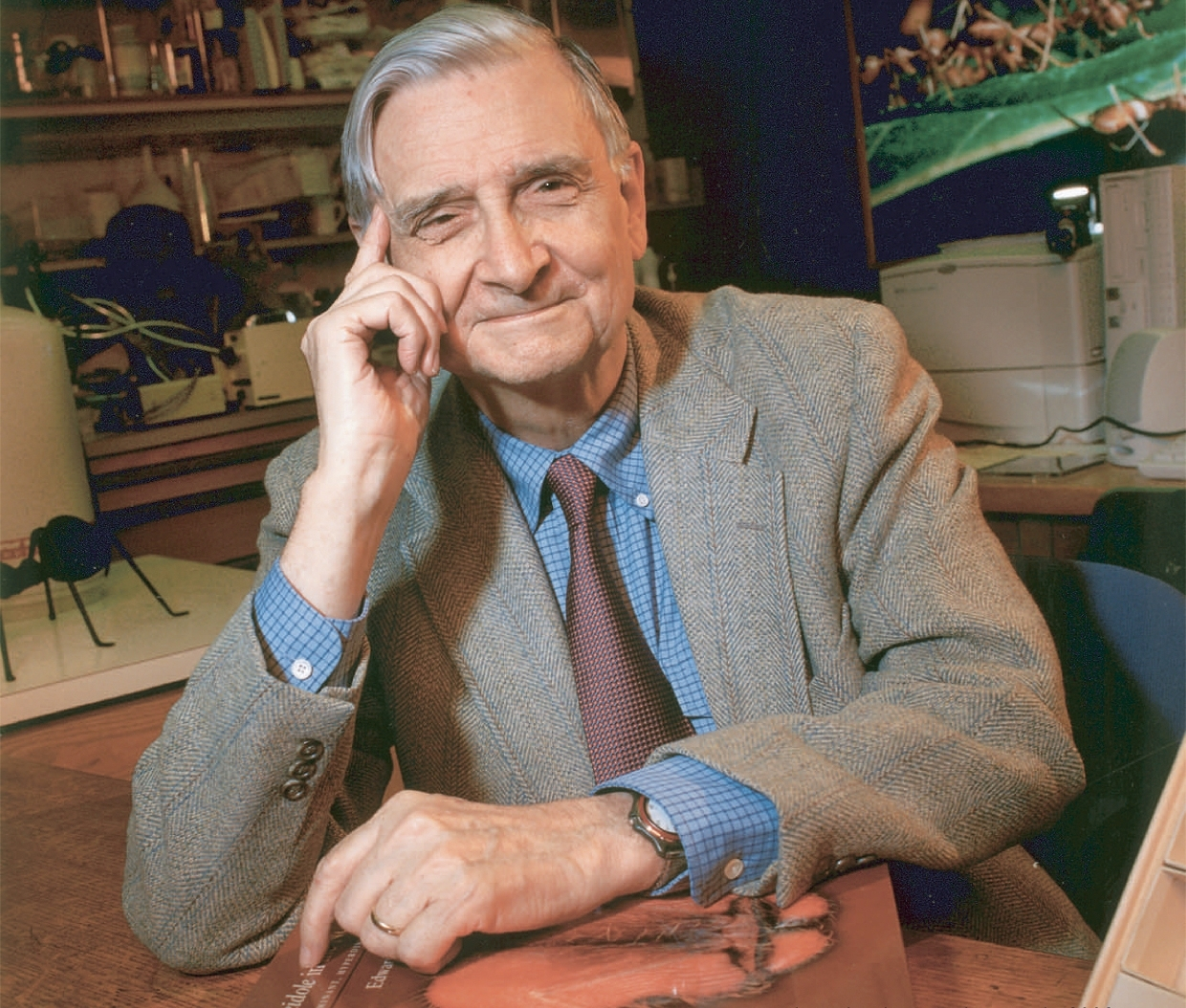
Wilson in 2003

From 1956 until 1996, Wilson was part of the faculty of Harvard. He began as an ant taxonomist and worked on understanding their microevolution, specifically how they developed into new species by escaping environmental disadvantages and moving into new habitats. He developed a theory of the "taxon cycle".

In collaboration with mathematician William H. Bossert, Wilson developed a classification of pheromones based on insect communication patterns. In the 1960s, he collaborated with mathematician and ecologist Robert MacArthur in developing the theory of species equilibrium. In the 1970s he and biologist Daniel S. Simberloff tested this theory on tiny mangrove islets in the Florida Keys. They eradicated all insect species and observed the repopulation by new species. Wilson and MacArthur's book The Theory of Island Biogeography became a standard ecology text.

In 1971, he published The Insect Societies, which argued that insect behavior and the behavior of other animals are influenced by similar evolutionary pressures. In 1973, Wilson was appointed the curator of entomology at the Harvard Museum of Comparative Zoology. In 1975, he published the book Sociobiology: The New Synthesis applying his theories of insect behavior to vertebrates, and in the last chapter, to humans. He speculated that evolved and inherited tendencies were responsible for hierarchical social organization among humans. In 1978 he published On Human Nature, which dealt with the role of biology in the evolution of human culture and won a Pulitzer Prize for General Nonfiction.

Wilson was named the Frank B. Baird Jr., Professor of Science in 1976. After he retired from Harvard in 1996, he became the Pellegrino University Professor Emeritus. In 1981 after collaborating with biologist Charles Lumsden, he published Genes, Mind and Culture, a theory of gene-culture coevolution. In 1990 he published The Ants, co-written with zoologist Bert Hölldobler, winning his second Pulitzer Prize for General Nonfiction.

In the 1990s, he published The Diversity of Life (1992); an autobiography, Naturalist (1994); and Consilience: The Unity of Knowledge (1998) about the unity of the natural and social sciences. Wilson was praised for his environmental advocacy, and his secular-humanist and deist ideas pertaining to religious and ethical matters.

Wilson was characterized by several titles during his career, including the "father of biodiversity", "ant man", and "Darwin's heir". In a PBS interview, David Attenborough described Wilson as "a magic name to many of us working in the natural world, for two reasons. First, he is a towering example of a specialist, a world authority. Nobody in the world has ever known as much as Ed Wilson about ants. But, in addition to that intense knowledge and understanding, he has the widest of pictures. He sees the planet and the natural world that it contains in amazing detail but extraordinary coherence".

=== Disagreement with Richard Dawkins ===
Although evolutionary biologist Richard Dawkins defended Wilson during the so-called "sociobiology debate", a disagreement between them arose over the theory of evolution. The disagreement began in 2012 when Dawkins wrote a critical review of Wilson's book The Social Conquest of Earth in Prospect Magazine. In the review, Dawkins criticized Wilson for rejecting kin selection and for supporting group selection, labeling it "bland" and "unfocused", and he wrote that the book's theoretical errors were "important, pervasive, and integral to its thesis in a way that renders it impossible to recommend". Wilson responded in the same magazine and wrote that Dawkins made "little connection to the part he criticizes" and accused him of engaging in rhetoric.

In 2014, Wilson said in an interview, "There is no dispute between me and Richard Dawkins and there never has been, because he's a journalist, and journalists are people that report what the scientists have found and the arguments I've had have actually been with scientists doing research". Dawkins responded in a tweet: "I greatly admire EO Wilson & his huge contributions to entomology, ecology, biogeography, conservation, etc. He's just wrong on kin selection" and later added, "Anybody who thinks I'm a journalist who reports what other scientists think is invited to read The Extended Phenotype". Biologist Jerry Coyne wrote that Wilson's remarks were "unfair, inaccurate, and uncharitable". In 2021, in an obituary to Wilson, Dawkins stated that their dispute was "purely scientific". Dawkins wrote that he stands by his critical review and doesn't regret "its outspoken tone", but noted that he also stood by his "profound admiration for Professor Wilson and his life work".

=== Support of J. Philippe Rushton ===
Prior to Wilson's death, his personal correspondences were donated to the Library of Congress at the library's request. Following his death, several articles were published discussing the discrepancy between Wilson's legacy as a champion of biogeography and conservation biology and his support of scientific racist pseudoscientist J. Philippe Rushton over several years. Rushton was a controversial psychologist at the University of Western Ontario, who later headed the Pioneer Fund.

From the late 1980s to the early 1990s, Wilson wrote several emails to Rushton's colleagues defending Rushton's work in the face of widespread criticism for scholarly misconduct, misrepresentation of data, and confirmation bias, all of which were allegedly used by Rushton to support his personal ideas on race. Wilson also sponsored an article written by Rushton in PNAS, and during the review process, Wilson intentionally sought out reviewers for the article who he believed would likely already agree with its premise. Wilson kept his support of Rushton's racist ideologies behind-the-scenes so as to not draw too much attention to himself or tarnish his own reputation. Wilson responded to another request from Rushton to sponsor a second PNAS article with the following: "You have my support in many ways, but for me to sponsor an article on racial differences in the PNAS would be counterproductive for both of us." Wilson also remarked that the reason Rushton's ideologies were not more widely supported is because of the "... fear of being called racist, which is virtually a death sentence in American academia if taken seriously. I admit that I myself have tended to avoid the subject of Rushton's work, out of fear."

In 2022, the E.O. Wilson Biodiversity Foundation issued a statement rejecting Wilson's support of Rushton and racism, on behalf of the board of directors and staff.

== Work ==
=== Sociobiology: The New Synthesis, 1975 ===
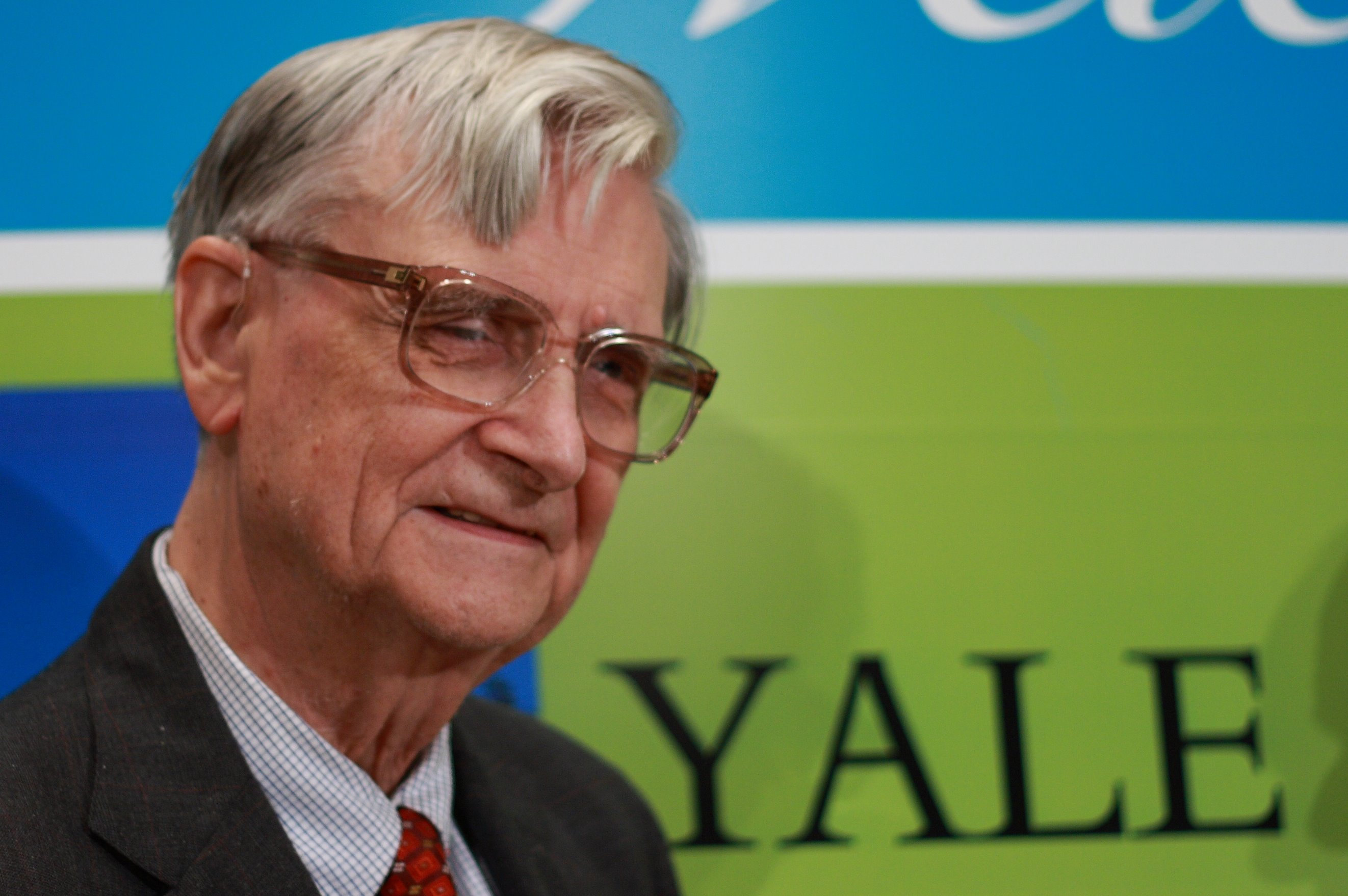
Wilson at the Peabody Museum of Natural History, 2007

Wilson used sociobiology and evolutionary principles to explain the behavior of social insects and then to understand the social behavior of other animals, including humans, thus establishing sociobiology as a new scientific field. He argued that all animal behavior, including that of humans, is the product of heredity, environmental stimuli, and past experiences, and that free will is an illusion. He referred to the biological basis of behavior as the "genetic leash". The sociobiological view is that all animal social behavior is governed by epigenetic rules worked out by the laws of evolution. This theory and research proved to be seminal, controversial, and influential.

Wilson argued that the unit of selection is a gene, the basic element of heredity. The target of selection is normally the individual who carries an ensemble of genes of certain kinds. With regard to the use of kin selection in explaining the behavior of eusocial insects, the "new view that I'm proposing is that it was group selection all along, an idea first roughly formulated by Darwin."

Sociobiological research was at the time particularly controversial with regard to its application to humans. The theory established a scientific argument for rejecting the common doctrine of tabula rasa, which holds that human beings are born without any innate mental content and that culture functions to increase human knowledge and aid in survival and success.

==== Reception and controversy ====
Sociobiology: The New Synthesis was initially met with praise by most biologists. After substantial criticism of the book was launched by the Sociobiology Study Group, associated with the organization Science for the People, a major controversy known as the "sociobiology debate" ensued, and Wilson was accused of racism, misogyny, and support for eugenics. Several of Wilson's colleagues at Harvard, such as Richard Lewontin and Stephen Jay Gould, both members of the Group, were strongly opposed. Both focused their criticism mostly on Wilson's sociobiological writings. Gould, Lewontin, and other members, wrote "Against 'Sociobiology'" in an open letter criticizing Wilson's "deterministic view of human society and human action". Other public lectures, reading groups, and press releases were organized criticizing Wilson's work. In response, Wilson produced a discussion article entitled "Academic Vigilantism and the Political Significance of Sociobiology" in BioScience.

In February 1978, while participating in a discussion on sociobiology at the annual meeting of the American Association for the Advancement of Science, Wilson was surrounded, chanted at and doused with water (Note: While primary and eyewitness accounts agree that the phrase "Racist Wilson you can't hide, we charge you with genocide!" was chanted, and that water was poured on Wilson's head, they disagree on whether a cup or a pitcher/jug was used.) by members of the International Committee Against Racism, who accused Wilson of advocating racism and genetic determinism. Steven Jay Gould, who was present at the event, and Science for the People, which had previously protested Wilson, condemned the attack.

Philosopher Mary Midgley encountered Sociobiology in the process of writing Beast and Man (1979) and significantly rewrote the book to offer a critique of Wilson's views. Midgley praised the book for the study of animal behavior, clarity, scholarship, and encyclopedic scope, but extensively critiqued Wilson for conceptual confusion, scientism, and anthropomorphism of genetics.

=== On Human Nature, 1978 ===
Wilson wrote in his 1978 book On Human Nature, "The evolutionary epic is probably the best myth we will ever have." Wilson's fame prompted use of the morphed phrase epic of evolution. The book won the Pulitzer Prize in 1979.

=== The Ants, 1990 ===
Wilson, along with Bert Hölldobler, carried out a systematic study of ants and ant behavior, culminating in the 1990 encyclopedic work The Ants. Because much self-sacrificing behavior on the part of individual ants can be explained on the basis of their genetic interests in the survival of the sisters, with whom they share 75% of their genes (though the actual case is some species' queens mate with multiple males and therefore some workers in a colony would only be 25% related), Wilson argued for a sociobiological explanation for all social behavior on the model of the behavior of the social insects.

Wilson said in reference to ants that "Karl Marx was right, socialism works, it is just that he had the wrong species". He asserted that individual ants and other eusocial species were able to reach higher Darwinian fitness putting the needs of the colony above their own needs as individuals because they lack reproductive independence: individual ants cannot reproduce without a queen, so they can only increase their fitness by working to enhance the fitness of the colony as a whole. Humans, however, do possess reproductive independence, and so individual humans enjoy their maximum level of Darwinian fitness by looking after their own survival and having their own offspring.

=== Consilience, 1998 ===
In his 1998 book Consilience: The Unity of Knowledge, Wilson discussed methods that have been used to unite the sciences and might be able to unite the sciences with the humanities. He argued that knowledge is a single, unified thing, not divided between science and humanistic inquiry. Wilson used the term "consilience" to describe the synthesis of knowledge from different specialized fields of human endeavor. He defined human nature as a collection of epigenetic rules, the genetic patterns of mental development. He argued that culture and rituals are products, not parts, of human nature. He said art is not part of human nature, but our appreciation of art is. He suggested that concepts such as art appreciation, fear of snakes, or the incest taboo (Westermarck effect) could be studied by scientific methods of the natural sciences and be part of interdisciplinary research.

== Spiritual and political beliefs ==
=== Scientific humanism ===
Wilson coined the phrase scientific humanism as "the only worldview compatible with science's growing knowledge of the real world and the laws of nature". Wilson argued that it is best suited to improve the human condition. In 2003, he was one of the signers of the Humanist Manifesto.

=== God and religion ===
On the question of God, Wilson described his position as "provisional deism" and explicitly denied the label of "atheist", preferring "agnostic". He explained his faith as a trajectory away from traditional beliefs: "I drifted away from the church, not definitively agnostic or atheistic, just Baptist & Christian no more." Wilson argued that belief in God and the rituals of religion are products of evolution. He argued that they should not be rejected or dismissed, but further investigated by science to better understand their significance to human nature. In his book The Creation, Wilson wrote that scientists ought to "offer the hand of friendship" to religious leaders and build an alliance with them, stating that "Science and religion are two of the most potent forces on Earth and they should come together to save the creation."

Wilson made an appeal to the religious community on the lecture circuit at Midland College, Texas, for example, and that "the appeal received a 'massive reply'", that a covenant had been written and that a "partnership will work to a substantial degree as time goes on".

In a New Scientist interview published on January 21, 2015, however, Wilson said that religious faith is "dragging us down", and:

I would say that for the sake of human progress, the best thing we could possibly do would be to diminish, to the point of eliminating, religious faiths. But certainly not eliminating the natural yearnings of our species or the asking of these great questions.

=== Ecology ===
Wilson said that, if he could start his life over he would work in microbial ecology, when discussing the reinvigoration of his original fields of study since the 1960s. He studied the mass extinctions of the 20th century and their relationship to modern society, and identifying mass extinction as the greatest threat to Earth's future. In 1998 argued for an ecological approach at the Capitol:

Now when you cut a forest, an ancient forest in particular, you are not just removing a lot of big trees and a few birds fluttering around in the canopy. You are drastically imperiling a vast array of species within a few square miles of you. The number of these species may go to tens of thousands. ... Many of them are still unknown to science, and science has not yet discovered the key role undoubtedly played in the maintenance of that ecosystem, as in the case of fungi, microorganisms, and many of the insects.

From the late 1970s Wilson was actively involved in the global conservation of biodiversity, contributing and promoting research. In 1984 he published Biophilia, a work that explored the evolutionary and psychological basis of humanity's attraction to the natural environment. This work introduced the word biophilia which influenced the shaping of modern conservation ethics. In 1988 Wilson edited the BioDiversity volume, based on the proceedings of the first US national conference on the subject, which also introduced the term biodiversity into the language. This work was very influential in creating the modern field of biodiversity studies. In 2011, Wilson led scientific expeditions to the Gorongosa National Park in Mozambique and the archipelagos of Vanuatu and New Caledonia in the southwest Pacific. Wilson was part of the international conservation movement, as a consultant to Columbia University's Earth Institute, as a director of the American Museum of Natural History, Conservation International, The Nature Conservancy and the World Wildlife Fund.

Understanding the scale of the extinction crisis led him to advocate for forest protection, including the "Act to Save America's Forests", first introduced in 1998 and reintroduced in 2008, but never passed. The Forests Now Declaration called for new markets-based mechanisms to protect tropical forests. Wilson once said destroying a rainforest for economic gain was like burning a Renaissance painting to cook a meal. In 2014, Wilson called for setting aside 50% of Earth's surface for other species to thrive in as the only possible strategy to solve the extinction crisis. The idea became the basis for his book Half-Earth (2016) and for the Half-Earth Project of the E.O. Wilson Biodiversity Foundation. Wilson's influence regarding ecology through popular science was discussed by Alan G. Gross in The Scientific Sublime (2018).

Wilson was instrumental in launching the Encyclopedia of Life (EOL) initiative with the goal of creating a global database to include information on the 1.9 million species recognized by science. Currently, it includes information on practically all known species. This open and searchable digital repository for organism traits, measurements, interactions and other data has more than 300 international partners and countless scientists providing global users' access to knowledge of life on Earth. For his part, Wilson discovered and described more than 400 species of ants.

== Retirement and death ==
In 1996, Wilson officially retired from Harvard University, where he continued to hold the positions of Professor Emeritus and Honorary Curator in Entomology. He fully retired from Harvard in 2002 at age 73. After stepping down, he published more than a dozen books, including a digital biology textbook for the iPad.

He founded the E.O. Wilson Biodiversity Foundation, which finances the PEN/E. O. Wilson Literary Science Writing Award and is an "independent foundation" at the Nicholas School of the Environment at Duke University. Wilson became a special lecturer at Duke University as part of the agreement.

Wilson and his wife, Irene, resided in Lexington, Massachusetts. He had a daughter, Catherine. His wife died on August 7, 2021. He died in nearby Burlington, Massachusetts on December 26, 2021, at the age of 92.

== Awards and honors ==
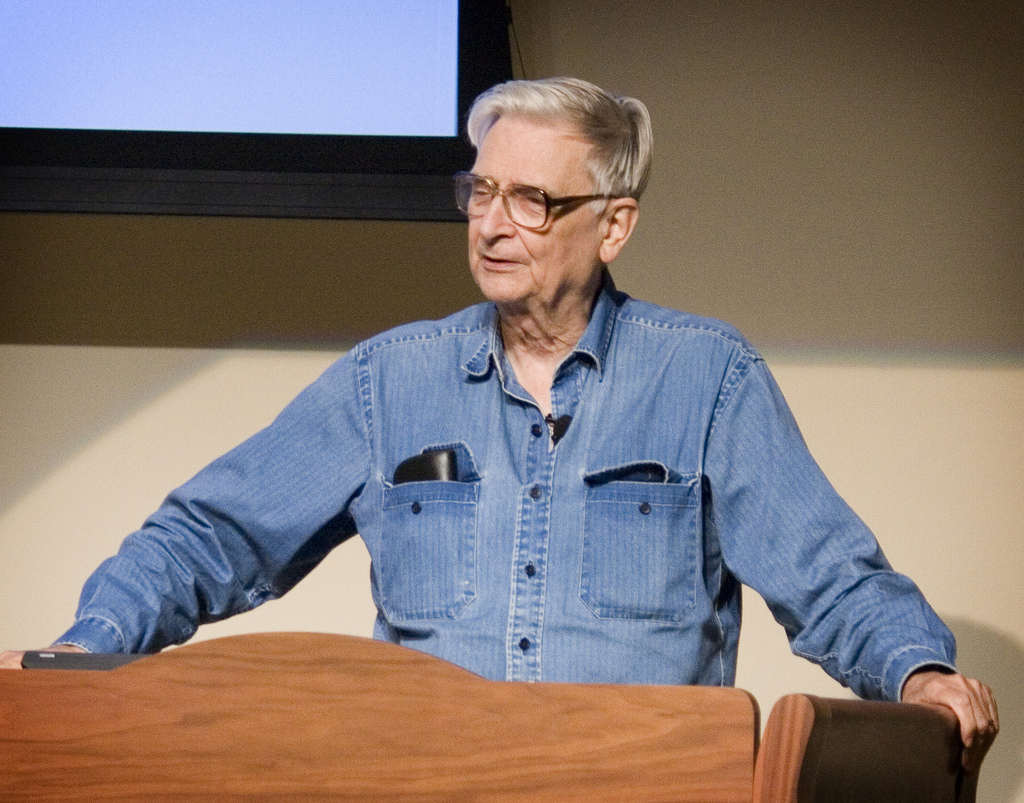
Wilson addresses the audience at the dedication of the Biophilia Center named for him at Nokuse Plantation in Walton County, Florida.

Wilson's scientific and conservation honors include:

- Member of the American Academy of Arts and Sciences, elected 1959
- Member of the National Academy of Sciences, elected 1969
- Member of the American Philosophical Society, elected 1976.
- U.S. National Medal of Science, 1977
- Leidy Award, 1979, from the Academy of Natural Sciences of Philadelphia
- Pulitzer Prize for On Human Nature, 1979
- Tyler Prize for Environmental Achievement, 1984
- ECI Prize, International Ecology Institute, terrestrial ecology, 1987
- Honorary doctorate from the Faculty of Mathematics and Science at Uppsala University, Sweden, 1987
- Academy of Achievement Golden Plate Award, 1988
- His books The Insect Societies and Sociobiology: The New Synthesis were honored with the Science Citation Classic award by the Institute for Scientific Information.
- Crafoord Prize, 1990, a prize awarded by the Royal Swedish Academy of Sciences
- Pulitzer Prize for The Ants (with Bert Hölldobler), 1991
- International Prize for Biology, 1993
- Carl Sagan Award for Public Understanding of Science, 1994
- The National Audubon Society's Audubon Medal, 1995
- Time magazine's 25 Most Influential People in America, 1995
- Certificate of Distinction, International Congresses of Entomology, Florence, Italy 1996
- Benjamin Franklin Medal for Distinguished Achievement in the Sciences of the American Philosophical Society, 1998.
- American Humanist Association's 1999 Humanist of the Year
- Lewis Thomas Prize for Writing about Science, 2000
- Nierenberg Prize, 2001
- Distinguished Eagle Scout Award 2004
- Dauphin Island Sea Lab christened one of its research vessels the R/V E.O. Wilson.
- Linnean Tercentenary Silver Medal, 2006
- Addison Emery Verrill Medal from the Peabody Museum of Natural History, 2007
- TED Prize, 2007 given yearly to "honor a maximum of three individuals who have shown that they can, in some way, positively impact life on this planet."
- XIX Premi Internacional Catalunya 2007
- E.O. Wilson Biophilia Center on Nokuse Plantation in Walton County, Florida 2009 video
- The Explorers Club Medal, 2009
- BBVA Foundation Frontiers of Knowledge Award, 2010, Ecology and Conservation Biology Category
- Thomas Jefferson Medal in Architecture, 2010
- 2010 Heartland Prize for fiction for his first novel Anthill: A Novel
- EarthSky Science Communicator of the Year, 2010
- International Cosmos Prize, 2012
- Fellow of the Ecological Society of America, 2012
- Kew International Medal (2014)
- Doctor of Science, honoris causa, from the American Museum of Natural History (2014)
- 2016 Harper Lee Award
- Commemoration in the species' epithet of Myrmoderus eowilsoni (2018)
- Commemoration in the species' epithet of Miniopterus wilsoni (2020)
- Busk Medal by the Royal Geographical Society in 2002.

== Main works ==
- Brown, W. L.; Wilson, E. O. (1956). "Character displacement". Systematic Zoology. 5 (2): 49–64. doi:10.2307/2411924. JSTOR 2411924., coauthored with William Brown Jr.; paper honored in 1986 as a Science Citation Classic, i.e., as one of the most frequently cited scientific papers of all time.
- The Theory of Island Biogeography, 1967, Princeton University Press (2001 reprint), ISBN 978-0-691-08836-5, with Robert H. MacArthur
- The Insect Societies, 1971, Harvard University Press, ISBN 978-0-674-45490-3
- Sociobiology: The New Synthesis 1975, Harvard University Press, (Twenty-fifth Anniversary Edition, 2000 ISBN 978-0-674-00089-6)
- On Human Nature, 1979, Harvard University Press, ISBN 978-0-674-01638-5, winner of the 1979 Pulitzer Prize for General Nonfiction.
- Genes, Mind and Culture: The Coevolutionary Process, 1981, Harvard University Press, ISBN 978-0-674-34475-4
- Promethean Fire: Reflections on the Origin of Mind, 1983, Harvard University Press, ISBN 978-0-674-71445-8
- Biophilia, 1984, Harvard University Press, ISBN 978-0-674-07441-5
- Success and Dominance in Ecosystems: The Case of the Social Insects, 1990, Inter-Research, ISSN 0932-2205
- The Ants, 1990, Harvard University Press, ISBN 978-0-674-04075-5, Winner of the 1991 Pulitzer Prize, with Bert Hölldobler
- The Diversity of Life, 1992, Harvard University Press, ISBN 978-0-674-21298-5, The Diversity of Life: Special Edition, ISBN 978-0-674-21299-2
- The Biophilia Hypothesis, 1993, Shearwater Books, ISBN 978-1-55963-148-8, with Stephen R. Kellert
- Journey to the Ants: A Story of Scientific Exploration, 1994, Harvard University Press, ISBN 978-0-674-48525-9, with Bert Hölldobler
- Naturalist, 1994, Shearwater Books, ISBN 978-1-55963-288-1
- In Search of Nature, 1996, Shearwater Books, ISBN 978-1-55963-215-7, with Laura Simonds Southworth
- Consilience: The Unity of Knowledge, 1998, Knopf, ISBN 978-0-679-45077-1
- The Future of Life, 2002, Knopf, ISBN 978-0-679-45078-8
- Pheidole in the New World: A Dominant, Hyperdiverse Ant Genus, 2003, Harvard University Press, ISBN 978-0-674-00293-7
- The Creation: An Appeal to Save Life on Earth, September 2006, W. W. Norton & Company, Inc. ISBN 978-0-393-06217-5
- Nature Revealed: Selected Writings 1949–2006, ISBN 978-0-8018-8329-3
- The Superorganism: The Beauty, Elegance, and Strangeness of Insect Societies, 2009, W.W. Norton & Company, Inc. ISBN 978-0-393-06704-0, with Bert Hölldobler
- Anthill: A Novel, April 2010, W. W. Norton & Company, Inc. ISBN 978-0-393-07119-1
- Kingdom of Ants: Jose Celestino Mutis and the Dawn of Natural History in the New World, 2010, Johns Hopkins University Press, Baltimore, with José María Gómez Durán ISBN 978-0-8018-9785-6
- The Leafcutter Ants: Civilization by Instinct, 2011, W.W. Norton & Company, Inc. ISBN 978-0-393-33868-3, with Bert Hölldobler
- The Social Conquest of Earth, 2012, Liveright Publishing Corporation, New York, ISBN 978-0-87140-363-6
- Letters to a Young Scientist, 2014, Liveright, ISBN 978-0-87140-385-8
- A Window on Eternity: A Biologist's Walk Through Gorongosa National Park, 2014, Simon & Schuster, ISBN 978-1-4767-4741-5
- The Meaning of Human Existence, 2014, Liveright, ISBN 978-0-87140-100-7
- Half-Earth, 2016, Liveright, ISBN 978-1-63149-082-8
- The Origins of Creativity, 2017, Liveright, ISBN 978-1-63149-318-8
- Genesis: The Deep Origin of Societies, 2019, Liveright; ISBN 978-1-63149-554-0
- Tales from the Ant World, 2020, Liveright, ISBN 978-1-63149-556-4
- Naturalist: A Graphic Adaptation November 10, 2020, Island Press; ISBN 978-1-61091-958-6

=== Edited works ===
- From So Simple a Beginning: Darwin's Four Great Books, edited with introductions by Edward O. Wilson (2005, W. W. Norton) ISBN 978-0-393-06134-5
