= Anthill (novel) =

2010 book by E. O. Wilson

Anthill: A Novel
- Cover of the first edition
- Author: E. O. Wilson
- Language: English
- Publisher: W. W. Norton & Company
- Publication date: 2010
- Media type: Print
- Pages: 378 pp.
- ISBN: 9780393071191

Anthill: A Novel is a 2010 novel by the biologist Edward O. Wilson. His first extended work of fiction, it won the Chicago Tribune's Heartland Prize for fiction.

Anthill, set in the US state of Alabama, follows protagonist Raff Semmes, who sets out to save the Nokobee wilderness from developers. The novel explores a concurrent civil war between rival ant colonies struggling to dominate the riverine wilderness.
