= Taxon cycle =

Taxon cycles refer to a biogeographical theory of how species evolve through range expansions and contractions over time associated with adaptive shifts in the ecology and morphology of species. The taxon cycle concept was explicitly formulated by biologist E. O. Wilson in 1961 after he surveyed the distributions, habitats, behavior and morphology of ant species in the Melanesian archipelago.

== Stages of the taxon cycle ==
Wilson categorized species into evolutionary "stages", which today are commonly described in the outline by Ricklefs & Cox (1972). However, with the advent of molecular techniques to construct time-calibrated phylogenetic relationships between species, the taxon cycle concept was further developed to include well-defined temporal scales and combined with concepts from ecological succession and speciation cycle theories. Taxon cycles have mainly been described in island settings (archipelagos), where the distributions and movements of species are readily recognized, but may also occur in continental biota.

- Stage I: Young, rapidly expanding, undifferentiated, widely and continuously distributed species in the initial colonization stage inhabiting small island, coastal or disturbed (marginal) habitat. Such species are hypothesized to include very good dispersers, ephemeral species and ecological "supertramps".
- Stage II: Species that are generally widespread across many islands, but where geographical expansion has slowed, population differentiation has generated subspecies or incipient species, and local extinction on small islands may have created gaps in the distribution. This stage includes species that have maintained a relatively good dispersal ability such as "great speciators". Early-stage "species complexes" may consist of stage II species.
- Stage III: Older, well-differentiated and well-defined species that have moved to habitats inland (and uphill) and where reduced dispersal ability and extinctions have fragmented the distribution to fewer and larger islands. These species may be niche specialists, but novel adaptations or accidental dispersal may restart the taxon cycle.
- Stage IV: Old, relictual, endemic species in the "final" stage are restricted to island interiors (mountains) on a few, large islands. This stage includes sedentary high‐elevation specialists with limited dispersal abilities and small range sizes. These species are evolutionary distinctive, as closely related species (and subspecies) have gone extinct.

The ecology and evolution of the Melanesian ants that originally inspired Wilson's hypothesis have since been shown to be consistent with the taxon cycle predictions using modern methods. Ricklefs & Bermingham (2002) estimated that taxon cycles take place over periods of 0.1-10 million years in different bird groups of the Lesser Antilles islands. Pepke et al. (2019) used the difference in mean age of late- and early-stage species as a lower estimate (4.7 million years) of the tempo of taxon cycling in an Indo-Pacific bird family.
