= Consilience (book) =

1998 book by E. O. Wilson

Consilience. The unity of knowledge
- Cover of the first edition
- Author: E. O. Wilson
- Language: English
- Subject: Consilience
- Publication date: 1998
- Publication place: United States
- Media type: Print (Hardcover and Paperback)
- Pages: 332 pp.
- ISBN: 9780679450771

Consilience: The Unity of Knowledge is a 1998 book by the biologist E. O. Wilson, in which the author discusses methods that have been used to unite the sciences and might in the future unite them with the humanities.

Wilson uses the term consilience to describe the synthesis of knowledge from different specialized fields of human endeavor.

== Definition of consilience ==
Wilson's book defines consilience as "Literally a 'jumping together' of knowledge by the linking of facts and fact-based theory across disciplines to create a common groundwork of explanation." The word is borrowed from Whewell's phrase the consilience of inductions in his book Philosophy of the Inductive Sciences. Whewell posited that this consilience of inductions occurs when an induction obtained from one class of facts coincides with an induction obtained from a different class. In this way a consilience is a test of the truth of a theory.

== Examples of consilience discussed by Wilson ==
=== Chapter 1 The Ionian enchantment ===
- The New Synthesis of Darwin's theory of evolution with genetics is an example of unification.
- Gerald Holton coined the phrase "the Ionian Enchantment" to name the conviction that the world has a unified order and can be explained by natural laws.
- Thales of Miletus proposed that water is the unifying basis for all material things. This theory that water is fundamental is often cited as the first materialistic theory of a unified view of nature.
- Modern physics attempts a unification of forces in its Grand Unified Theory.
- Albert Einstein's work provides several examples of unification within the field of physics, for example, unification of Brownian motion with atomic theory.
- Science and religion have a unity of purpose: both want to explain the universe and understand our role in the universe.

=== Chapter 2 The great branches of learning ===
- Environmental protection requires us to combine knowledge from government regulators such as the United States Environmental Protection Agency; from ethics and social science; and from biology and physical sciences like chemistry.
- There is a unity of purpose to philosophy and science. Philosophers and scientists can work together at the borders between biology, social science, and the humanities.
- Liberal arts education can be revitalized by the recognition of the unity of knowledge in higher education.
- Government policy requires unified knowledge from across specialized disciplines in the natural sciences, social sciences, and humanities.

=== Chapter 3 The Enlightenment ===
- The Enlightenment is discussed in the context of the application of scientific knowledge to human rights and social progress.
- Marquis de Condorcet systematically applied mathematics in the social sciences.
- Francis Bacon was an early advocate of data collection and its analysis as the basis of sound knowledge (the Baconian method) in fields that include social science and the humanities.
- René Descartes believed that the universe is rational and united and that interconnected truths run from physics to biology to moral reasoning. Descartes unified geometry and algebra (see Cartesian coordinate system).
- Isaac Newton unified Galileo's laws of falling bodies with Copernicus' laws of planetary motion in his own law of universal gravitation.
- Pioneers of social science Adolphe Quetelet and Auguste Comte developed the idea of studying behavior with scientific methods.
- Postmodernism and science share a unity of purpose. Wilson argues that humanity is driven forward by the tension between those who upon viewing order create disorder and those who upon viewing disorder create order.

=== Chapter 4 The natural sciences ===
- The Greek Atomists such as Leucippus and Democritus are credited with the reductionistic idea that matter has fundamental components. Scientific investigation of this idea has resulted in unification across the natural sciences. An example is the understanding that the molecular structure of DNA accounts for genetic storage in living cells.
- Discussing experimental epistemology, Wilson treats a modern attempt to unify neuroscience and epistemology. He proposes it as a method for clarifying the evolutionary basis of mismatches between physical reality and our mental models of reality.
- Positivism is a method for comparing and unifying knowledge from different disciplines. It places priority on facts which are generated by experiment and objective observation rather than subjective speculations.
- Pragmatism is also a method for comparing and unifying knowledge from different disciplines, one in which priority is given to methods and techniques that can be demonstrated to work and have pragmatic value.

=== Chapter 5 Ariadne's thread ===
- Wilson contrasts deduction and synthesis. Many examples are given comparing consilience by reduction (dissection of a phenomenon into its components) and consilience by synthesis (predicting higher-order phenomena from more basic physical principles). One specific example is Wilson's own work on the chemical signals that regulate insect social behavior.
- An example of consilience by reduction is Wilson's attempt to account for the prevalence of serpent symbols in human cultures. He incorporates the activation–synthesis model of dreaming.
- The biological disciplines exhibit consilience. Wilson discusses the successes (cells explained in terms of their chemical components, embryo development in terms of interactions between the cells of an embryo) but also points to the remaining problem of dealing with complex systems as in neuroscience and ecology.
- In a classical example, statistical mechanics explains the behavior of volumes of gas in terms of the molecules of the gas (kinetic theory).
- Quantum chemistry is the reduction of chemical properties by quantum mechanical calculations.

=== Chapter 6 The mind ===
- Consciousness and emotion can be explained in terms of brain activity. Wilson describes the neurobiological approach to accounting for consciousness and emotion in terms of brain physiology and discusses how this effort is guided by collaboration between biologists, psychologists, and philosophers.
- Wilson proposes that it will be possible to construct a neurobiology of aesthetics which will unify our understanding of the subjective experiences shared and explored by art. Common neural patterns of activity will be found to correspond to fundamental aesthetic experiences.
- In a discussion of artificial emotion, Wilson proposes that human-like artificial intelligence will require the engineering of a computational apparatus for processing an array of rich sensory inputs and the capacity to learn from those inputs in the way that children can learn. This work will require consilience between biology, psychology, and computer science.

=== Chapter 7 From genes to culture ===
- Exploring the relationship between genes and culture, Wilson posits that the basic element of culture is the meme. When a meme exists in a brain it has the form of a neuronal network that allows the meme to function within semantic memory. The link from genes to culture is that our genes shape our brains (in cooperation with the environment) and our brains allow us to work with memes as the basic units of culture.

=== Chapter 8 - 12 ===
The final chapters of Wilson's Consilience are:

- Chapter 8 The fitness of human nature
- Chapter 9 The social sciences
- Chapter 10 The arts and their interpretation
- Chapter 11 Ethics and religion
- Chapter 12 To what end?

== See also ==
- Wendell Berry wrote a comprehensive critique of Consilience in his essay Life is a Miracle in his book with the same title.
- Philosophy of science
- The Two Cultures by C. P. Snow
- The Hedgehog, the Fox, and the Magister's Pox by Stephen Jay Gould (includes a direct refutation of Wilson's arguments)
- A Guide for the Perplexed by E. F. Schumacher
