= Sociobiology: The New Synthesis =

1975 book by biologist E. O. Wilson

- Cover of the first edition
- Author: Edward O. Wilson
- Language: English
- Subject: Sociobiology
- Publisher: Harvard University Press
- Publication date: 1975
- Publication place: United States
- Media type: Print (hardcover and paperback)
- Pages: 697
- ISBN: 0-674-00089-7
- OCLC: 42289674
- Dewey Decimal: 591.56 21
- LC Class: QL775 .W54 2000
- Preceded by: The Insect Societies
- Followed by: On Human Nature (1978)

Sociobiology: The New Synthesis (1975; 25th anniversary edition 2000) is a book by the biologist E. O. Wilson. It helped start the sociobiology debate, one of the great scientific controversies in biology of the 20th century and part of the wider debate about evolutionary psychology and the modern synthesis of evolutionary biology. Wilson popularized the term "sociobiology" as an attempt to explain the evolutionary mechanics behind social behaviour such as altruism, aggression, and the nurturing of the young. It formed a position within the long-running nature versus nurture debate. The fundamental principle guiding sociobiology is that an organism's evolutionary success is measured by the extent to which its genes are represented in the next generation.

The book was generally well-reviewed in biological journals. It received a much more mixed reaction among sociologists, mainly triggered by the brief coverage of the implications of sociobiology for human society in the first and last chapters of the book; the body of the text was largely welcomed. Such was the level of interest in the debate that a review reached the front page of the New York Times. The sociologist Gerhard Lenski, admitting that sociologists needed to look further into non-human societies, agreed that human society was founded on biology but denied both biological reductionism and determinism. Lenski observed that since the nature-nurture dichotomy was false, there was no reason for sociologists and biologists to disagree. Other sociologists objected in particular to the final chapter, on "Man": Devra G. Kleiman called Wilson's attempt to extend his thesis to humans weak and premature, and noted that he had largely overlooked the importance of co-operative behaviour and females in mammalian societies.

== Context ==
E. O. Wilson was an American biologist, specialising in the study of ants, social insects on which he was the world's leading expert. He is known also for his pioneering work on island biogeography, which relates species richness to island size, an important consideration in nature conservation. Wilson however favoured group selection over the Neo-Darwinian kin selection as an explanation of co-operation in social animals.

== Book ==
=== Publication ===
The book was first published in 1975. It has been reprinted at least 14 times up to 2014. It has been translated into languages including Chinese, Japanese, and Spanish. An abridged edition was published in 1980.

=== Illustrations ===
The book is illustrated with 31 halftone figures, 209 line drawings by Sarah Landry, and 43 tables. The drawings of animal societies were considered "informing and attractive".

=== Contents ===
==== Part I. Social Evolution ====
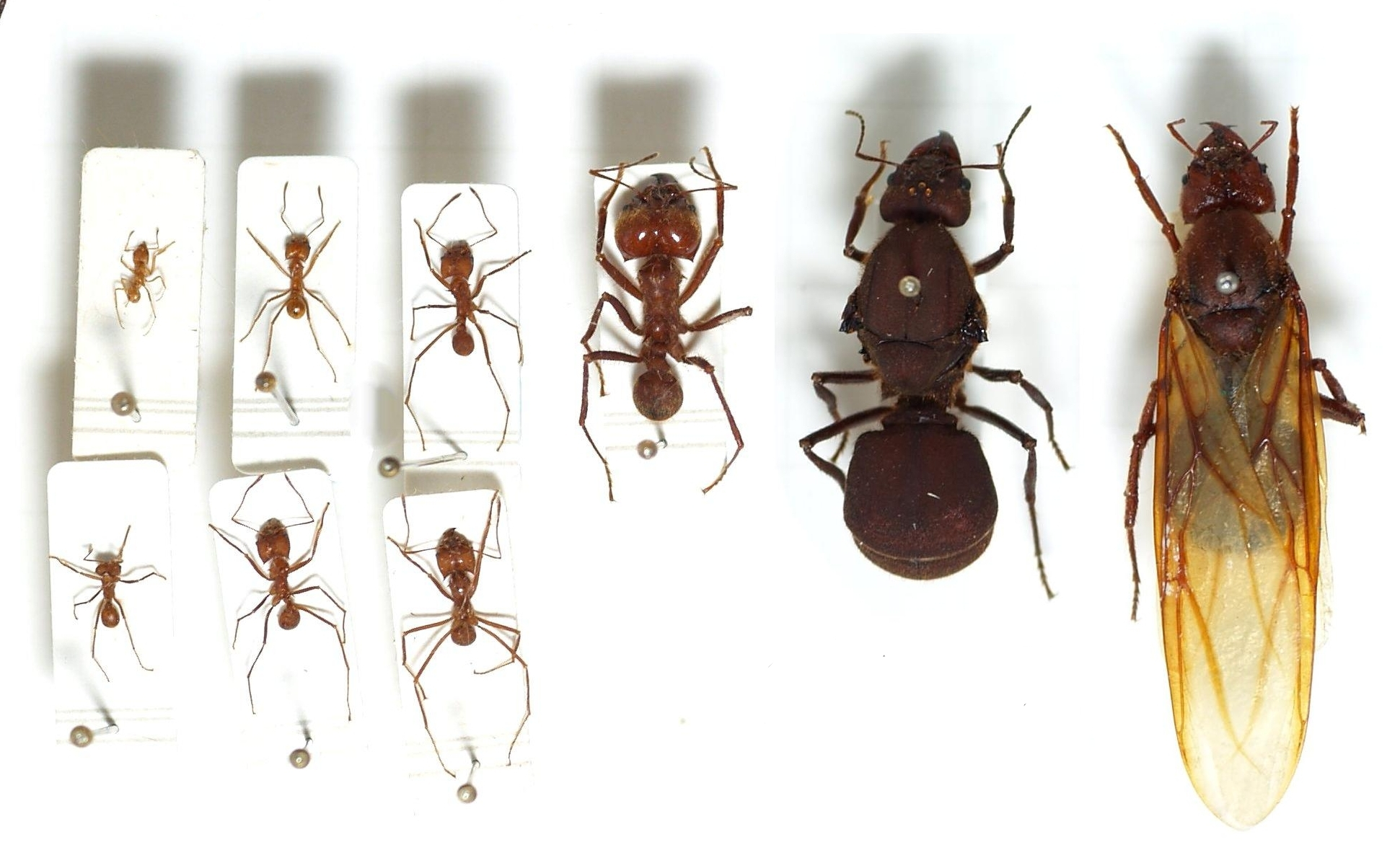
Social evolution: ant societies have evolved elaborate caste structures, in this species, Atta cephalotes, widely different in size and function.

The section summarizes the concepts of population genetics, a branch of evolutionary theory combining Mendelian genetics and natural selection in mathematical form to explain the pressures on animal societies. In particular, altruism, self-sacrificing behaviour, would die out unless something such as kin or group selection maintains it.

1. The Morality of the Gene
2. Elementary Concepts of Sociobiology
3. The Prime Movers of Social Evolution
4. The Relevant Principles of Population Biology
5. Group Selection and Altruism

==== Part II. Social Mechanisms ====
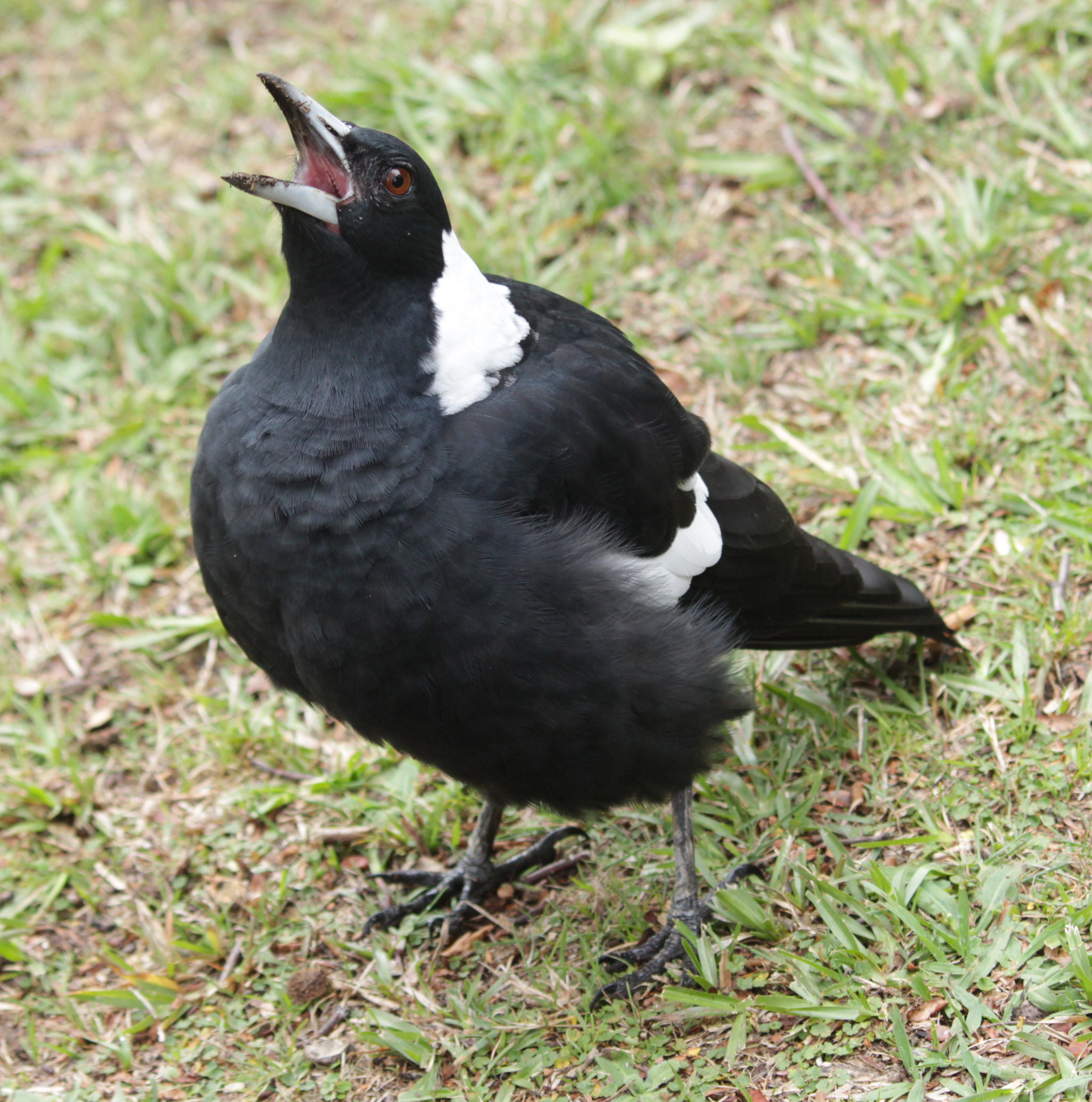
Social mechanisms: aggressive display of an Australian magpie

This section describes the types of social behaviour in animals, including the principles of animal communication, aggression, dominance systems, and insect castes.

6. Group Size, Reproduction, and Time-Energy Budgets
7. The Development and Modification of Social Behavior
8. Communication: Basic Principles
9. Communication: Functions and Complex Systems
10. Communication: Origins and Evolution
11. Aggression
12. Social Spacing, Including Territory
13. Dominance Systems
14. Roles and Castes
15. Sex and Society
16. Parental Care
17. Social Symbioses

==== Part III. The Social Species ====
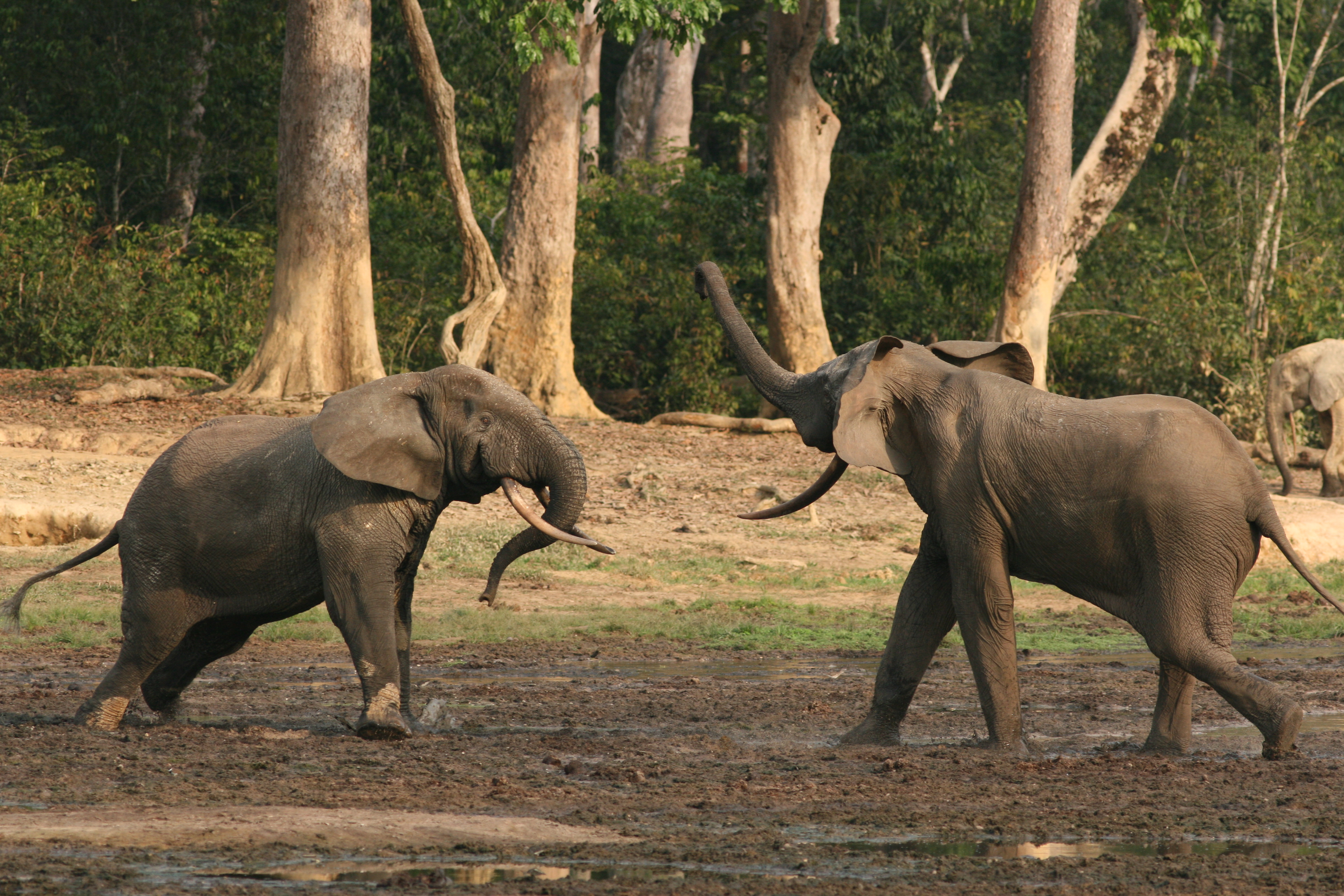
Animals such as elephants have complex societies. Here, two males struggle for dominance.

The section describes the distribution of social behaviour in different taxa. The theme is that evolution is progressive, with four pinnacles of social evolution, namely the colonial invertebrates such as corals, the social insects, mammals other than humans, and finally humans. The last chapter argues that natural selection has made humans far more flexible in social organisation than any other species.

18. The Four Pinnacles of Social Evolution
19. The Colonial Microorganisms and Invertebrates
20. The Social Insects
21. The Cold-Blooded Vertebrates
22. The Birds
23. Evolutionary Trends within the Mammals
24. The Ungulates and Elephants
25. The Carnivores
26. The Nonhuman Primates
27. Man: From Sociobiology to Sociology

== Reception ==
=== Contemporary ===
Sociobiology attracted a large number of critical reviews, not only by biologists, but by social scientists who objected especially to Wilson's application of Darwinian thinking to humans, asserting that Wilson was implying a form of biological determinism. It was, unusually, reviewed on the front page of the New York Times in May 1975, and again in November that year as the controversy grew. The paper described the effect as "a period of ferment", naming the "monumental" book as the "yeast" [which caused the brew to bubble]. The Times noted that the debate was an updated version of the nature or nurture argument that had simmered ever since Darwin's time: "The assertion that man's body is a biological machine, subject to biological rules, has never completely shaken the conviction that the human intellect and human behavior are unique, the subject of free will." The paper reported that Wilson's colleague at Harvard, Richard Lewontin, had issued a 5,000 word attack on the book, and that the "meticulous" Wilson had said "I've tried to be extremely cautious in all this". The paper noted that Wilson had nowhere actually said that human behaviour was totally determined by genes, and reported him as saying that a rough figure was 10 percent genetic.

==== By biologists ====
The theoretical biologist Mary Jane West-Eberhard reviewed the book in detail for The Quarterly Review of Biology as a work "of special significance". She began it with a fable of a "small community of modest scholars called natural historians" who all practised their own sciences, until one day a man who "had been called Entomologist, Ecologist, and even Biochemist" arose among them and pronounced "there shall be a new science". She wrote that Wilson had "assumed god-like powers with this book", attempting to reformulate the foundations of the social sciences, making ethology and comparative psychology obsolete, and restructuring behavioural biology. She marvelled at the "sustained enthusiasm and authoritativeness" across a wide range of fields not Wilson's own, and the usefulness of many of the chapters. "In this book sociobiology is a patchwork neatly stitched from relevant pieces of other fields, without a bold new theoretical pattern of its own". She objected strongly to what she considered Wilson's "confused and misleading" discussion of altruism and group selection, arguing that kin selection provided an alternative (fully Darwinian) explanation and that Wilson was wrong to make it seem that group selection was necessary.

Charles D. Michener, an entomologist, reviewed the book for BioScience. He observed that its scope was far wider than the social insects of Wilson's previous book The Insect Societies, dealing with "social phenomena from the slime molds to man". He found the review of population biology (Part I) excellent. He noted Wilson's statement that altruism is the central problem of sociobiology, and remarks that Wilson's account in fact indicates the solution, kin selection. He describes the chapter on Man as being "from the viewpoint of a very knowledgeable extraterrestrial visitor recording man's social natural history".

The ornithologist Herbert Friedmann, reviewing the book for The Journal of Wildlife Management, called the book very important for its coverage of topics including of humans, and its "interpretive attitude". It would be a convenient summary of any of the groups it covers for the student, and the question of bio-ethics of interest to every "intelligent biologist". Friedmann noted that Wilson has "the courage of his convictions" to suggest in the chapter on Man that "human ethics and morality should be expressed biologically rather than philosophically", something that "need not deter the zoologist" since in Friedmann's view ethics does not exist in the human sense "in the nonhuman world".

David Barash, a psychologist, thought it "about time" students of behaviour were finally becoming Darwinian, starting to turn the "ramshackle" science into something with firmer intellectual foundations. He defended sociobiology, arguing that it does not claim that genes somehow control behaviour, but that they along with experience and culture contribute to it. He speculated that it might be possible to make valid predictions about human behaviour by studying "cross-cultural universals in human behaviour", combining anthropology and evolutionary biology's theorem of fitness maximization.

==== By sociologists ====
The sociologist Eileen Barker reviewed the book for The British Journal of Sociology. She called it an "impressive tome (it weighs 5 lb)" and "a comprehensive, beautifully laid out and illustrated reference book covering the amazing variety of animal social behaviour". She noted that the final section on "Man" contained "several surprises for most sociologists", and that the book should counter "many of the naive inferences that have recently been made about man's evolutionary heritage."

Marion Blute, in Contemporary Sociology, noted that it was rare for any book to be reviewed on the front page of the New York Times, or to receive "the extremes of reaction" seen for Sociobiology. She found that "the clarity, breadth and richness of accurately rendered detail in this monograph is really quite breath-taking." However, she objected to the claim that the book covered the biological basis of all social behaviour, as it did not cover what she called the "epigenetic disciplines", the effects of the environment on the embryonic and later development of the individual including learning (nurture, not just nature). She called the gap "unfortunate" and pointed out that "the development problem" and the functioning of the human brain were the frontiers of research. She observed, citing Dobzhansky, that "an evolutionary minded sociology which really appreciated the significance of sociocultural transmission along nongenetic lines would likely see society and culture in a very different way". Despite Wilson's neglect of "epigenetic" and social sciences, she urged sociologists to read "this exceptionally fine book", noting that despite its length it should have been twice as long. She looked forward to seeing sociology coming to terms with the neo-Darwinian synthesis, something that was already under way, which (she argued) would enrich social theory, a much better result than the alternative possibility, a renewed waste of time on the nature-versus-nurture debate.

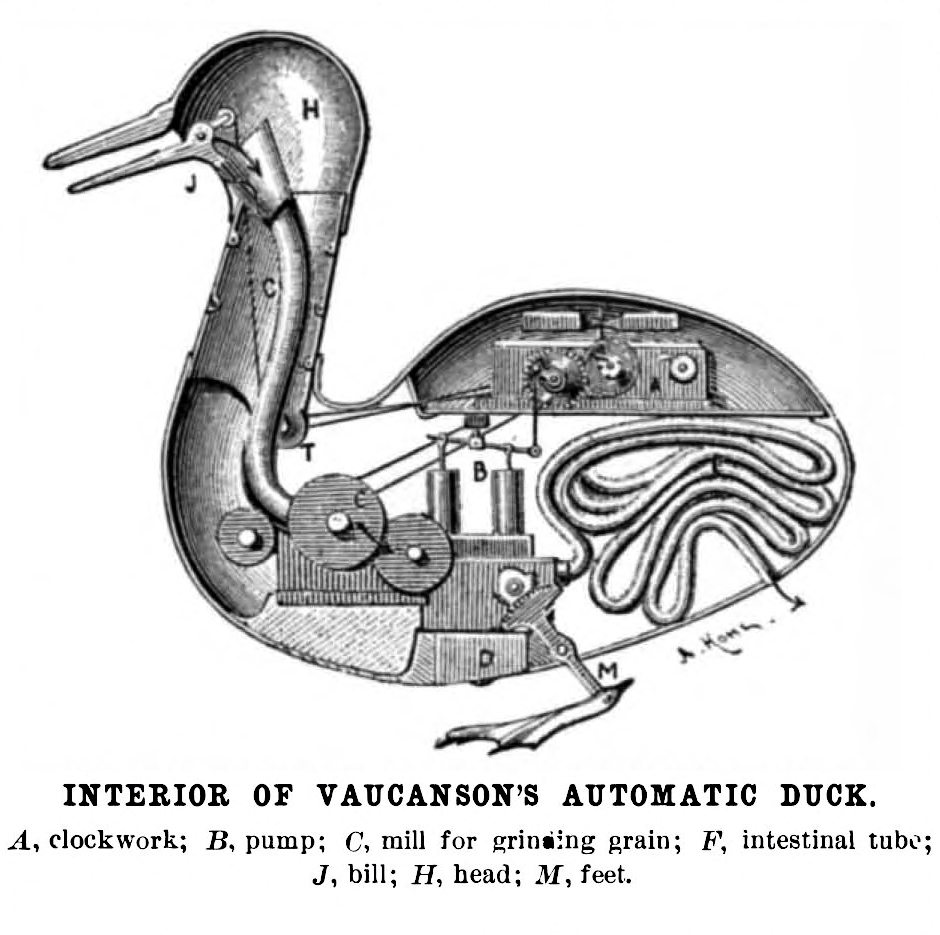
Some authors suspected Wilson of reductionism, attempting to explain animal behaviour as an automatic result of biological mechanisms.

Gerhard Lenski, in Social Forces, admitted that sociologists had too often ignored non-human societies, and thought the book should be required reading. Human societies were plainly founded on biology, but this did not imply either biological reductionism or determinism. Comparison with other species would be productive, as nonhuman societies often had traditions handed down from one generation to the next, such as "the flyways of migratory birds or dietary patterns among primates". Issues of conflict and cooperation were similarly illuminated. But in his view the book raised "uncomfortable issues". The first chapter could sound, he argued, like "intellectual imperialism" as Wilson called sociology "an essentially nontheoretical, descriptive science, not unlike taxonomy and ecology forty years ago, before they were 'reshaped entirely ... [by] neo-Darwinian evolutionary theory'". Lenski however took Wilson more openly than that, noting Wilson's precursors, Julian Huxley, George Gaylord Simpson, Dobzhansky and others of the modern synthesis. They had tried repeatedly to talk to sociologists, and in Lenski's view that remained necessary. Further, he suggested, the nature-nurture dichotomy was evidently false, so there was no reason for sociologists and biologists to disagree. In his view, continued rejection of biology by sociologists only invited "a reductionist response on the part of biologists." Lenski found the final chapter on Man "disappointing", as Wilson had been unable to penetrate the "barriers" put up by social science against the modern synthesis, and Wilson's overestimation of the influence of genetics compared to culture and technology on human society. All the same, Lenski thought these "flaws" could be mended by dialogue between sociology and biology.

Allan Mazur reviewed the book for the American Journal of Sociology. He called it an excellent and comprehensive survey, and said he found very few errors, though for instance squirrel monkeys did have dominance hierarchies. But he found the chapter on Man disappointing: it was trite, value-loaded, or wrong; used data uncritically, and seemed to be based on "Gerhard and Jean Lenski's introductory textbook". Further, he agreed with Wilson that scientific theories must be falsifiable, and stated "I claim that the bulk of Wilson's theorizing is not falsifiable and therefore is of little value." This was because Wilson's "theorizing" was sometimes tautologous, sometimes hopelessly vague, and sometimes based on unobservable past events. For instance, Mazur argued that Wilson's claim that altruism has evolved in most social species is untestable: Mazur denied that a mother's action to save her baby is altruistic, as (by kin selection) it increases her own fitness. However, Mazur was glad that Wilson has "legitimate[d] the biological approach to sociology", even if other books like Robert Hinde's 1974 Biological Bases of Human Social Behaviour were of more use to sociologists.

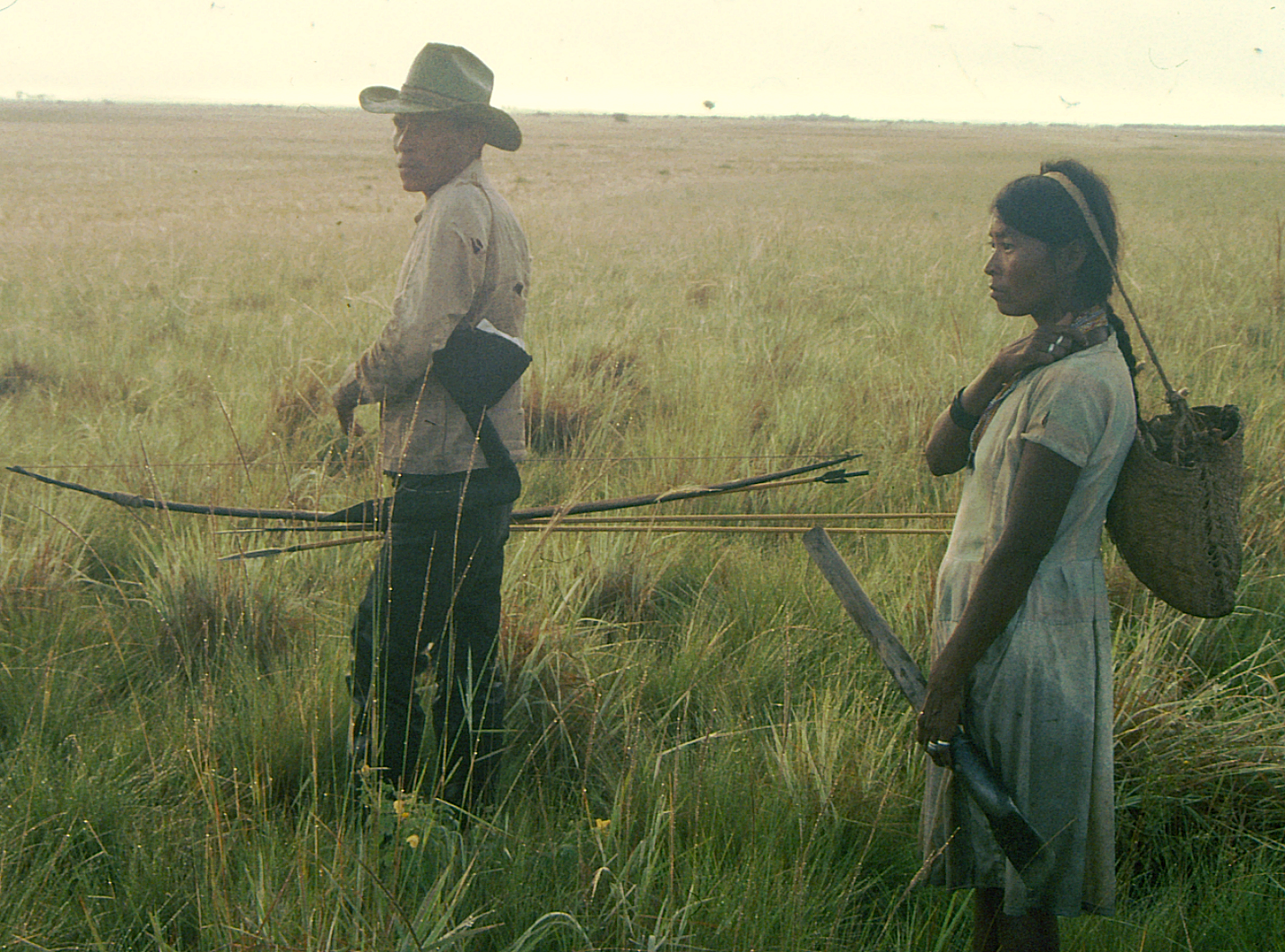
Sociologists such as Devra G. Kleiman noted that Wilson had largely overlooked the importance of women and of co-operation, as with this Savanna Pumé couple on a hunting and gathering trip in the llanos of Venezuela.

Devra G. Kleiman reviewed the work for Signs. She called it "a remarkable attempt to explain the evolution of social behavior and social systems in animals by a synthesis of several disciplines within biology", but noted that it had been severely criticised by some biologists and social scientists. She observed that "it gives less attention to the environmental control of behavior" than to genetics. But "Wilson's ultimate sin" was to include the final chapter, "unfortunately titled 'Man'", attracting "the wrath of those who would deny the influence of biology on human behavior because of its political and social connotations." She called this a pity, since while his attempt to include humans in his analysis was "admittedly weak and premature", the general principles were correct – for instance, she argued, it was useful to know the genetic relatedness of individuals when assessing social interactions. She considered Wilson "nonrigorous and biased in his application of theory in certain areas". His biases included over-representation of insects, genetics, and the dominance of male mammals over females: Wilson had further exaggerated a bias from an ethology literature written mainly by males. Conversely, he had undervalued co-operative behaviour among mammals, except where it concerned males, ignoring the fact that, Kleiman argued, genetically related females were the core of most mammal societies. Wilson's book was in her view valuable as a framework for future research, but premature as a "Synthesis".

==== By other disciplines ====
The philosopher of politics Roger D. Masters reviewed the book for the American Political Science Review, stating that it was impossible both to review the book and not to do so, given the "attention" it had received. In his view, the book "has the indisputable merit of showing that the existence of complex societies is a biological phenomenon. By emphasizing the relationships between animal behavior and population genetics, Wilson compels us to recognize the evolutionary significance of events which social scientists often treat without reference to Darwinian biology." But there was "a large gap" between that and the work of most political scientists, and it was too early to attempt to apply sociobiology directly to human social issues in practice. He concluded that the book was fascinating, provocative, and the start of a return to the tradition "as old as Aristotle" where man is seen as "a 'political animal'", since social behaviour had natural origins.

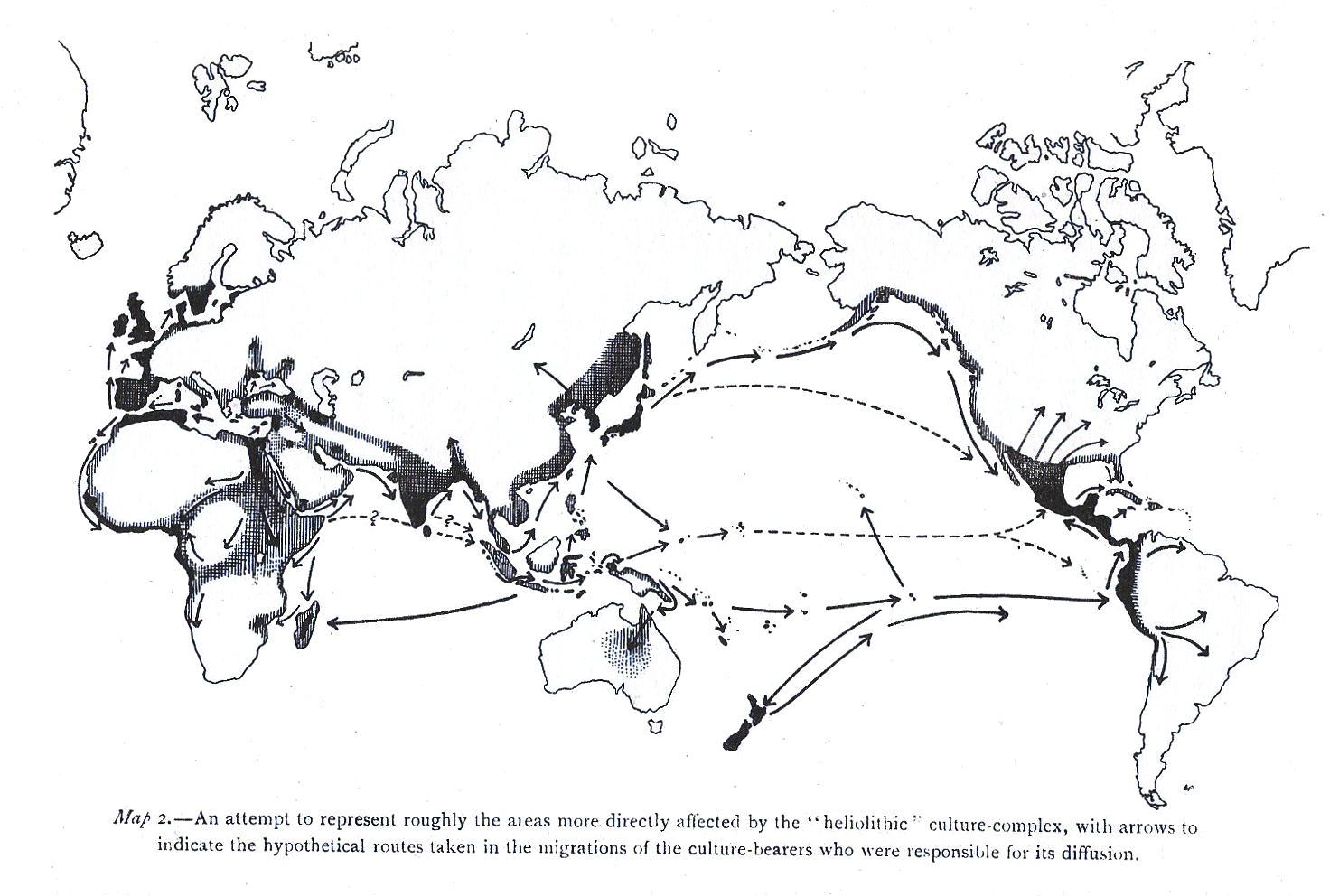
Cultural diffusion was already modelled and mapped long before Wilson, as here in the diffusion of heliolithic culture from Egypt, mapped by Grafton Elliot Smith (1928).

Philip L. Wagner, a geographer reviewing the book in Annals of the Association of American Geographers, argued that the book proposes a "fundamental thesis" for explaining the size, structure, and spatial arrangements of animal populations, all aspects of geography, and noted that Wilson and MacArthur's 1967 Theory of Island Biogeography had already set out some of these ideas. In his view, the most impressive aspect of the book was its mission to extend "rational deterministic explanation" far more widely. However, he thought the last chapter, extending the ideas to humans, far too brief and premature, as it failed to cover technology or tradition in general, while Wilson's speculations about "tradition drift" elsewhere in the book reinvented the study of diffusion of innovations and appeared unaware of "the now classical Hägerstrand diffusion models."

The biology teacher Lotte R. Geller, reviewing the book in The American Biology Teacher, thought the book meticulously researched; no one would take exception to its thesis, but for the inclusion of man. "[Wilson] is well aware of the difficulties this presents." Geller called the last chapter, relating biology to sociology, a "step from scientific study to speculation". In her view, the most controversial and disturbing thing was the call for scientist and humanists to "temporarily" remove ethics "from the hands of the philosophers and biologize" it. She called it "dangerous to say that biologists should have a monopoly on truth and ethics."

The anthropologist Frances L. Stewart, writing in the Bulletin of the Canadian Archaeological Association, noted that "An anthropologist reading this book is confronted by statements which contradict anthropological theory. The main argument that all social behavior has a biological basis would be questioned."

=== Human biological determinism controversy ===
The application of sociobiology to humans (discussed only in the first and last chapters of the book) was immediately controversial. Some researchers, led by Stephen Jay Gould and Richard Lewontin, contended that sociobiology embodied biological determinism. They argued that it would be used, as similar ideas had been in the past, to justify the status quo, entrench ruling elites, and legitimize authoritarian political programmes. They referred to social Darwinism and eugenics of the early 20th century, and other more recent developments, such as the IQ controversy of the early 1970s, as cautionary tales in the use of evolutionary principles as applied to human society. They believed that Wilson was committing the naturalistic fallacy, attempting to define moral principles using natural concepts. Academics opposed to Wilson's sociobiology, including Gould, Lewontin, Jon Beckwith, Ruth Hubbard, and Anthony Leeds created the Sociobiology Study Group of Science for the People to counter his ideas.

Other critics believed that Wilson's theories, as well as the works of subsequent admirers, were not supported scientifically. Objections were raised to many of the ethnocentric assumptions of early sociobiology (like ignoring female gatherers in favour of male hunters in hunter-gatherer societies) and to the sampling and mathematical methods used in informing conclusions. Many of Wilson's less well supported conclusions were attacked (for example, Wilson's mathematical treatment of inheritance as involving a single gene per trait, even though he admitted that traits could be polygenic). Sociobiologists were accused of being "super" adaptationists, or panadaptationist, believing that every aspect of morphology and behaviour must necessarily be an evolutionarily beneficial adaptation. Philosophical debates about the nature of scientific truth and the applicability of any human reason to a subject so complex as human behaviour, considering past failures, raged. Describing the controversy, Eric Holtzmans noted that "Given the baleful history of misuse of biology in justifying or designing social policies and practices, authors who attempt to consider human sociobiology have special responsibilities that are not adequately discharged by the usual academic caveats."

Wilson and his admirers countered these criticisms by saying that Wilson had no political agenda, and if he had one it was certainly not authoritarian, citing Wilson's environmentalism in particular. They argued that they as scientists had a duty to uncover the truth whether that was politically correct or not. Wilson called the claim that sociobiology is biological determinism "academic vigilantism" and the Sociobiology Study Group response "a largely ideological argument".

Noam Chomsky, a linguist and political scientist, surprised many by coming to the defense of sociobiology on the grounds that political radicals needed to postulate a relatively fixed idea of human nature in order to be able to struggle for a better society, claiming that leaders should know what human needs were in order to build a better society.

=== Retrospective ===
With the publication of the 25th anniversary edition in 2000, the historians of biology Michael Yudell and Rob Desalle reviewed the nature-nurture controversy around the book. "Once again", they wrote, "biological reductionism and genetic determinism became the focus of rancorous debates, discussions and diatribes within both academia and popular culture." They pointed out that the quest for a "sociobiologization" of biology was not new, mentioning Darwin's The Descent of Man, R.A. Fisher, and Julian Huxley, all touching on the biological basis of human society, followed by Konrad Lorenz, Desmond Morris and Robert Ardrey in the 1960s, and Richard Dawkins and David Barash in the 1970s. Wilson's choice of title echoed the modern synthesis (named by Huxley in 1942) and, the reviewers argued, meant to build upon and extend it. 25 years on, they noted, most of the discord had gone, and the discipline had been renamed as evolutionary psychology; they were surprised to find that Wilson was happy with that, and they called the new discipline pop psychology for people "who like telling just-so stories".

Concerning the anniversary edition, Yudell and Desalle thought it strange that nothing worth adding had happened in 25 years: the book remained a primary text, and Wilson's failure to develop it weakened the edition's impact. The early chapters still seemed a "lucid and engaging" introduction to population biology, but much of the rest seemed after 25 years to lack "methodological breadth", given that it did not cover the new fields that had emerged; while barely mentioning the growing importance of phylogenetic systematics seemed "curious". They pointed out that comparing human and "animal" social evolution "is tantamount to making homology" claims, but Wilson had said nothing about the need for a methodology to test behavioural homology. The reviewers were also troubled by Wilson's attitude to the debate, remaining "contemptuous of his anti-sociobiological opposition" and "opprobrium towards Marxism" (especially Gould and Lewontin). Yudell and Desalle noted the irony that Wilson despised Marxism but advocated an "aggressive paradigm ... seeking to blaze an historical path towards the future" (as Marxism did). They argued that by demonising his opponents in this way, Wilson created support for Sociobiology "not necessarily sustainable by his data and methodologies." He was still doing that 25 years on, stated the reviewers.

An extensive account of the controversy around the book was published at the same time as the new edition, largely supporting Wilson's views. Looking back at Sociobiology 35 years later, the philosopher of biology Michael Ruse called the book "a pretty remarkable achievement" of huge scope, "firmly in the Darwinian paradigm of evolution through natural selection". He found one aspect of the book "very peculiar" in its "metaphysical underpinning", namely that Wilson was committed to the idea of progress in biology, "the idea that organic life has proceeded from the very simple to the very complex, from the value-free to the value-laden, from (as they used to say in the 19th century) the monad to the man." Ruse observed that while producing humans might look like progress, evolution had "also produced smallpox and syphilis and potato blight," raising "serious doubts about whether evolution is progressive." Ruse noted that Gould's 1989 book Wonderful Life was entirely an attack on this idea of progress.

== Bibliography ==
- Eberhard, Mary Jane West (1976), "Sociobiology. The New Synthesis. by Edward O. Wilson", Quarterly Review of Biology, 51 (1): 89–92, doi:10.1086/409056, JSTOR 2825238, S2CID 84213631
