= Sociobiology =

Subdiscipline of biology regarding social behavior

Sociobiology is a field of biology that aims to explain social behavior in terms of evolution. It draws from disciplines including ethology and evolutionary biology. Within the study of human societies, sociobiology is closely related to evolutionary anthropology and human behavioral ecology.

Sociobiology investigates social behaviors such as the hive society of social insects. It argues that just as selection pressure led to animals evolving useful ways of interacting with the natural environment, so it led to the genetic evolution of advantageous social behavior.

While the term 'sociobiology' originated at least as early as the 1940s, the concept did not gain major recognition until the publication of E. O. Wilson's book Sociobiology: The New Synthesis in 1975. The field quickly became the subject of scientific controversy. Critics, led by Richard Lewontin and Stephen Jay Gould, argued that genes played a role in human behavior, but that traits such as aggressiveness could be explained by social environment rather than by biology. Sociobiologists responded by pointing to the complex relationship between nature and nurture. Among sociobiologists, the controversy between D. S. Wilson and E. O. Wilson on how much weight to assign to different levels of selection was settled in 2007.

== Definition ==
The entomologist E. O. Wilson defined sociobiology as "the extension of population biology and evolutionary theory to social organization". Within the study of human societies, sociobiology is closely related to sociology.

Sociobiology is based on the premise that some behaviors (social and individual) are at least partly inherited and can be affected by natural selection.

The discipline seeks to explain behavior as a product of natural selection. Behavior is therefore seen as an effort to preserve one's genes in the population. Inherent in sociobiological reasoning is the idea that certain genes or gene combinations that influence particular behavioral traits can be inherited from generation to generation. For example, newly dominant male lions often kill cubs in the pride that they did not sire. This behavior is adaptive because killing the cubs eliminates competition for their own offspring and causes the nursing females to come into heat faster, thus allowing more of the male's genes to enter into the population.

== History ==
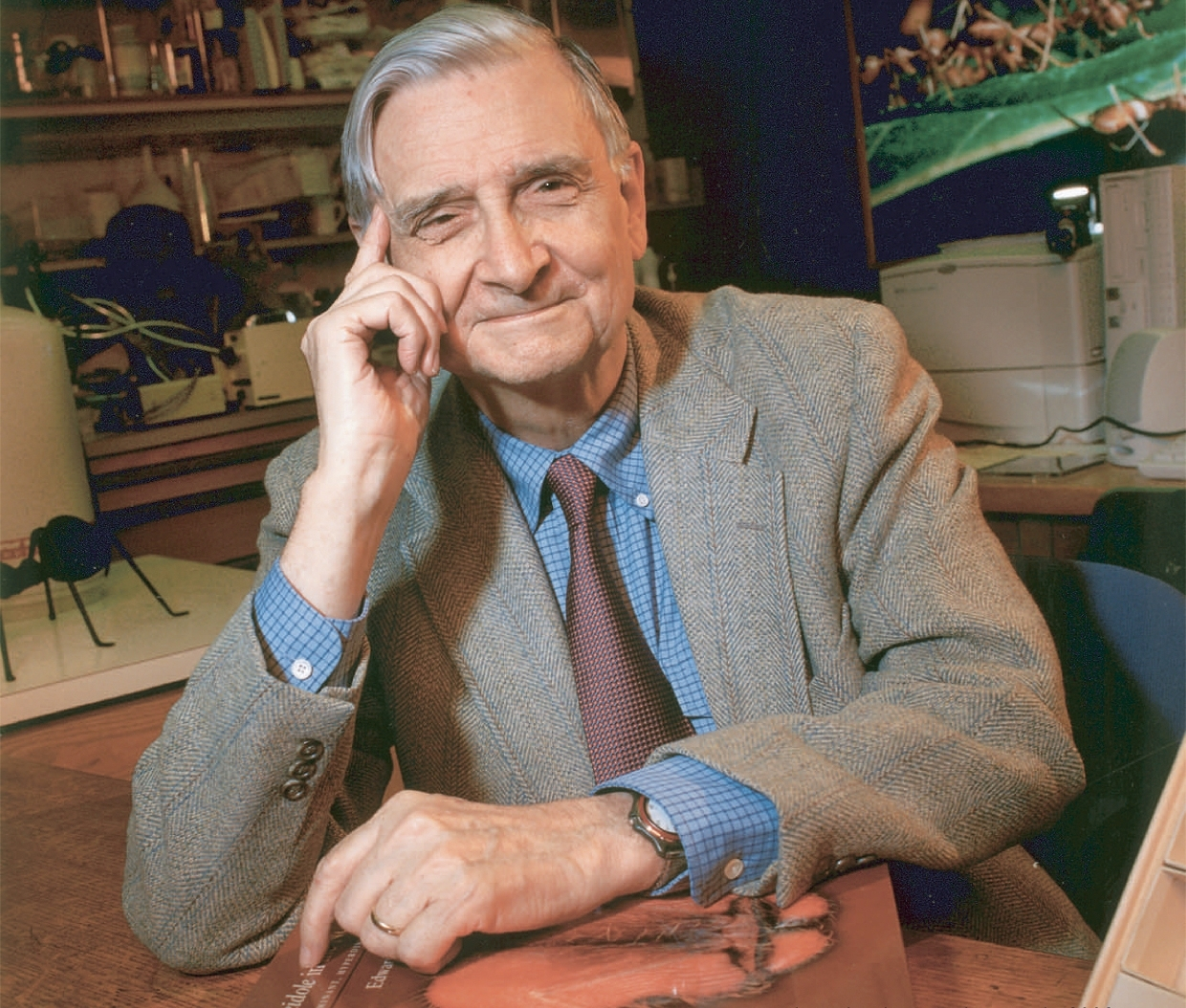
E. O. Wilson, a central figure in the history of sociobiology, from the publication in 1975 of his book Sociobiology: The New Synthesis

The philosopher of biology Daniel Dennett suggested that the political philosopher Thomas Hobbes was the first proto-sociobiologist, arguing that in his 1651 book Leviathan Hobbes had explained the origins of morals in human society from an amoral sociobiological perspective.

The animal behavior geneticist John Paul Scott coined the word sociobiology at a 1948 conference on genetics and social behavior, which called for a conjoint development of field and laboratory studies in animal behavior research.

Once a specialist term, "sociobiology" became widely known in 1975 when Wilson published his book Sociobiology: The New Synthesis.

The biological anthropologist Edward H. Hagen writes in The Handbook of Evolutionary Psychology that sociobiology is, despite the public controversy over its application to humans, "one of the scientific triumphs of the twentieth century." He adds that "Sociobiology is now part of the core research and curriculum of virtually all biology departments, and it is a foundation of the work of almost all field biologists." Sociobiological research on nonhuman organisms has increased dramatically and continuously in the world's top scientific journals such as Nature and Science. The more general term behavioral ecology is commonly substituted to avoid the public controversy.

== Theory ==
=== Natural selection ===
Sociobiology is founded on the concept of evolution of adaptive behavioral traits by natural selection.

Sociobiologists maintain that human and other animal behavior can be partly explained as the outcome of natural selection. They contend that to understand behavior fully, it must be analyzed in terms of evolution, principally by natural selection. Sociobiology is based upon two fundamental premises:

- Certain behavioral traits are inherited,
- Inherited behavioral traits have been honed by natural selection and were adaptive in the environment in which they evolved.

=== In humans ===
Behavioral traits such as creativity, extroversion, aggressiveness, and IQ have high heritability. Researchers are careful to point out that heritability does not constrain the influence that environmental or cultural factors may have on these traits.

Various theorists have argued that in some environments criminal behavior might be adaptive. The evolutionary neuroandrogenic theory, by the sociologist Lee Ellis, posits that sexual selection by women has led to increased competitive behavior among men, sometimes resulting in criminality. In another theory, the evolutionary psychologist Mark van Vugt argues that a history of intergroup conflict for resources between men have led to differences in violence and aggression between men and women. The novelist Elias Canetti has described applications of sociobiological theory to cultural practices such as slavery and autocracy.

=== Genetics ===
Genetic mouse mutants illustrate the power that genes exert on behavior. For example, the transcription factor FEV (aka Pet1), through its role in maintaining the serotonergic system in the brain, is required for normal aggressive and anxiety-like behavior. Thus, when FEV is genetically deleted from the mouse genome, male mice will instantly attack other males, whereas their wild-type counterparts take significantly longer to initiate violent behavior. In addition, FEV is required for correct maternal behavior in mice, such that offspring of mothers without the FEV factor do not survive unless cross-fostered to wild-type female mice.

A genetic basis for instinctive behavioral traits among non-human species is commonly accepted by biologists; but attempts to explain complex behaviors in human societies with genetics has remained extremely controversial.

=== Tinbergen's four questions ===
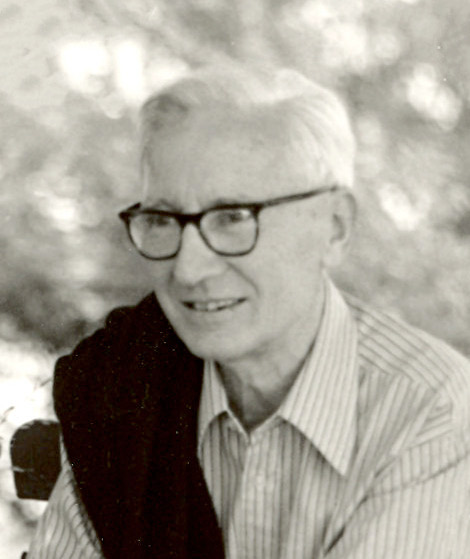
Nikolaas Tinbergen, whose four questions influenced sociobiology

Sociobiology uses Nikolaas Tinbergen's four questions to provide a framework for explanations of animal behavior. Two of these categories are at the species level, while the other two are at the individual level. The species-level categories (often called "ultimate explanations") are

- the adaptive function that a behavior serves and
- the historical evolutionary process (phylogeny) that resulted in this functionality.

The individual-level categories (often called "proximate explanations") are

- the development of the individual (ontogeny) and
- the proximate mechanism (such as brain anatomy and hormones).

== Reception ==
The cognitive psychologist Steven Pinker argues that critics have been overly swayed by politics and a fear of biological determinism, (Note: Biological determinism was a philosophy underlying the social Darwinian and eugenics movements of the early 20th century, and controversies in the history of intelligence testing.) accusing among others the paleontologist Stephen Jay Gould and the evolutionary biologist Richard Lewontin of being "radical scientists", whose stance on human nature is influenced by politics rather than science, while Lewontin, the neuroscientist Steven Rose and the psychologist Leon Kamin, who drew a distinction between the politics and history of an idea and its scientific validity, argue that sociobiology fails on scientific grounds. Gould grouped sociobiology with eugenics, criticizing both in his 1981 book The Mismeasure of Man. When the cultural anthropologist Napoleon Chagnon scheduled sessions on sociobiology at the 1976 American Anthropological Association convention, other scholars attempted to cancel them with what Chagnon later described as "Impassioned accusations of racism, fascism and Nazism"; Margaret Mead's support caused the sessions to occur as scheduled.

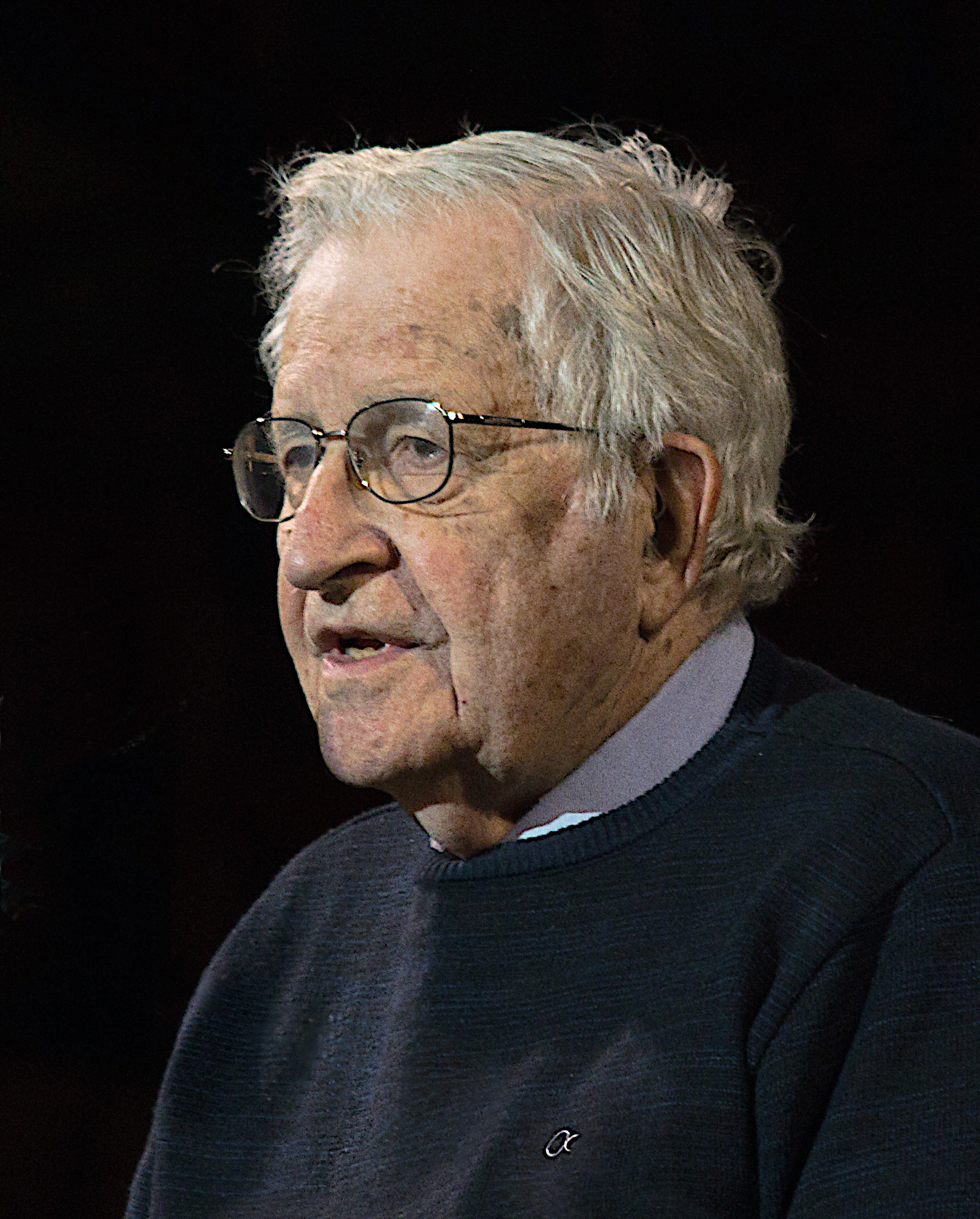
Noam Chomsky argued for a sociobiologically informed notion of human nature.

During a 1976 meeting of the Sociobiology Study Group, the philosopher and linguist Noam Chomsky argued for a sociobiologically informed notion of human nature. He stated that human beings are biological organisms and ought to be studied as such, with his criticism of the "blank slate" doctrine in the social sciences, in his 1975 Reflections on Language. Chomsky further hinted at the possible reconciliation of his anarchist political views and sociobiology in a discussion of the anarchist Russian political philosopher Peter Kropotkin's 1902 book of essays Mutual Aid: A Factor of Evolution. Kropotkin focused more on altruism than aggression, suggesting that anarchist societies were feasible because of an innate human tendency to cooperate.

Wilson said he had never meant to imply what ought to be, only what is the case. However, some critics countered that the language of sociobiology readily slips from "is" to "ought", an instance of the naturalistic fallacy. Pinker has argued that opposition to stances considered anti-social, such as ethnic nepotism, is based on moral assumptions, meaning that such opposition is not falsifiable by scientific advances. (Note: The history of this debate, and others related to it, are covered in detail by Cronin (1993), Segerstråle (2000), and Alcock (2001).)

== See also ==
- Biocultural anthropology
- Evolutionary developmental psychology
- Evolutionary psychology
- Human behavioral ecology
- Sociocultural evolution

== Sources ==
- Alcock, John (2001). The triumph of sociobiology. Oxford University Press. ISBN 978-0-19-514383-6.
- Cronin, Helena (1993). The ant and the peacock: Altruism and sexual selection from Darwin to today. Cambridge University Press. ISBN 978-0-521-45765-1.
- Segerstråle, Ullica (2000). Defenders of the truth: The sociobiology debate. Oxford University Press. ISBN 978-0-19-286215-0.
