= Biological Dynamics of Forest Fragments Project =

Ecological experiment established in Brazil in 1979

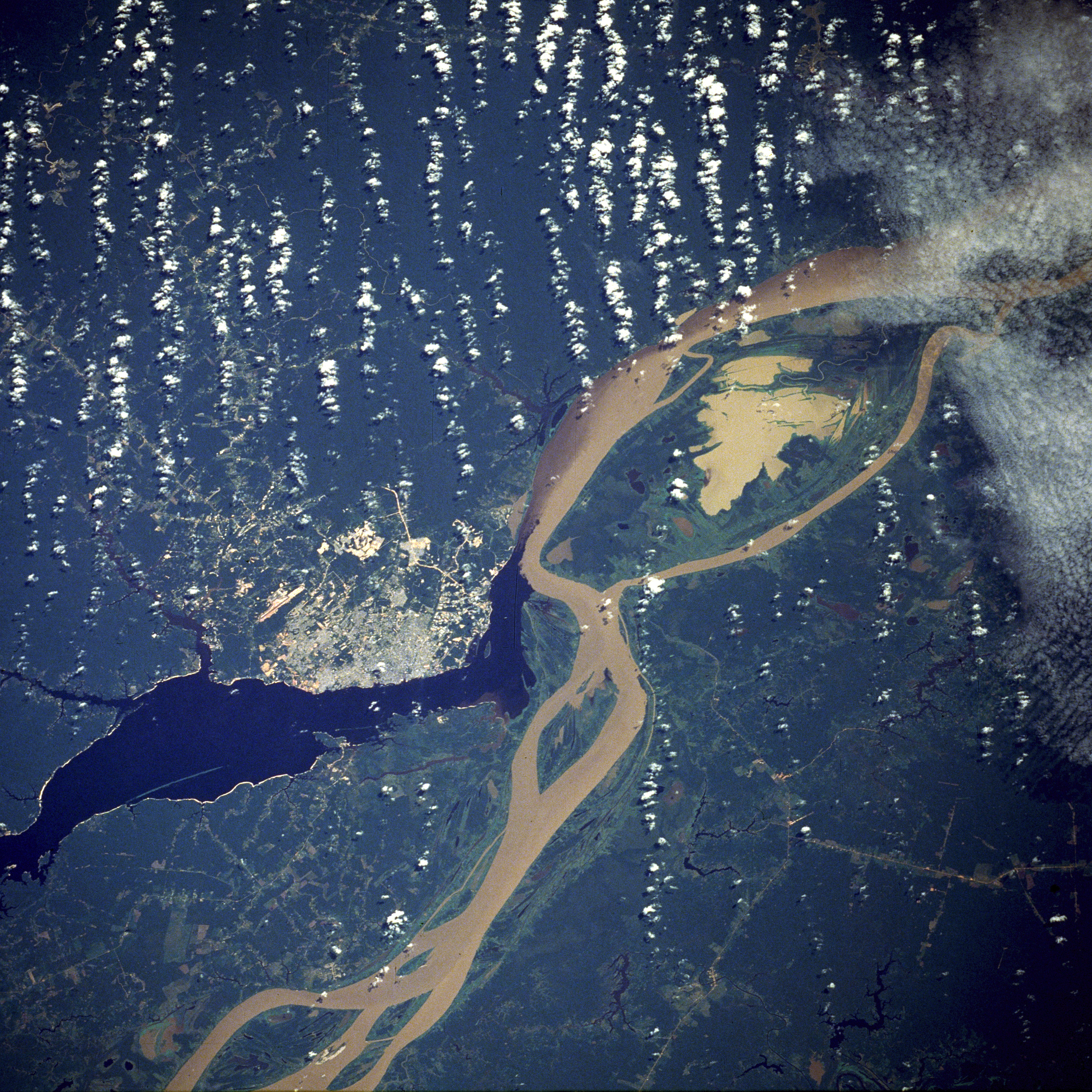
The Project is located near Manaus

The Biological Dynamics of Forest Fragments Project (BDFFP; or Projeto Dinâmica Biológica de Fragmentos Florestais, PDBFF, in Portuguese) is a large-scale ecological experiment looking at the effects of habitat fragmentation on tropical rainforest. The experiment which was established in 1979 is located near Manaus in the Brazilian Amazon rainforest. The project is jointly managed by the Amazon Biodiversity Center and the Brazilian Institute for Research in the Amazon (INPA).

The project was initiated in 1979 by Thomas Lovejoy to investigate the SLOSS debate. Initially named the Minimum Critical Size of Ecosystems Project, the project created forest fragments of sizes 1 hectare (2 acres), 10 hectares (25 acres), and 100 hectares (247 acres). Data were collected prior to the creation of the fragments and studies of the effects of fragmentation now exceed 25 years.

As of April 2020, 785 scholarly journal articles and more than 150 graduate dissertations and theses had emerged from the project.

== History ==
The Biological Dynamics of Forest Fragments Project (BDFFP), was born out of the SLOSS (single large or several small reserves of equal area) debate in the mid 1970s about the application of the theory of island biogeography to conservation planning. The debate was triggered when Dan Simberloff and Larry Abele questioned the use of the theory of island biogeography to the design of nature reserves. The theory, developed by Robert MacArthur and E. O. Wilson predicted that the species richness of an island increases as the area of a reserve increases and distance to mainland colonizing sources decreases. It also determined that the shape of a reserve is very important to the species diversity. Reserves with a large edge to area ratio tend to be affected more by edge effects than reserves with a small edge to area ratio. The distance between reserves and the habitat surrounding the reserves (the matrix) can affect species richness and diversity as well. The concept was applied to planning nature preserves, which are effectively islands in a sea of human-generated or dominated habitat. Simberloff and Abele argued that even though smaller reserves will hold fewer species than larger reserves, a series of small reserves could theoretically hold (protect) as many species as a single large reserve.

Despite the seeming logic of these ideas, ecologists questioned the results of the SLOSS debate due to the lack of a critical body of evidence on the subject. Many ecologists began to conduct studies and experiments on fragmented ecosystems to fill this gap, including Tom Lovejoy, who designed a large-scale experiment that studied the effects of different sizes of fragmentation to animals, plants, and ecological processes. The original idea was conceived in 1977. Lovejoy’s objective throughout the experiment was to gain insight on the effects of habitat fragmentation on species in tropical rainforests. He called it the Minimum Critical Size of Ecosystems Project (the name was later changed to the Biological Dynamics of Forest Fragments Project).

In 1978, Lovejoy hired Rob Bierregaard to implement the project on the ground. In 1979 the National Institute of Amazonian Research (INPA) endorsed and Brazil's National Research Council approved Lovejoy’s experiment. As soon as the permits were granted, Bierregaard moved to Brazil to launch the project in the rainforests on the north of Manaus. The BDFFP began as a collaborative project between the Brazilian National Institute for Amazonian Research and the World Wildlife Fund. It is now a joint project between INPA and the Smithsonian Institution. The BDFFP became one of the most important studies of fragmentation in tropical forests because it is the only long-running study with data before fragments were created with the original data being from the continuous forest.

== Project development and hypothesis ==
The study of habitat fragmentation found its roots early, with Aldo Leopold’s ideas on edge effect and Robert MacArthur and E. O. Wilson’s studies and models of island biogeography laying a foundation for the field (Laurance and Bierregaard 1997). These concepts offer potential applicable and hypothetico-deductive value for the study of forest fragmentation and have inspired debates about habitat reserve design.

Generally speaking, the theory of island biogeography represents a collection of interwoven ideas (Harris 1984), describing patterns of floral and faunal communities on marine islands. It models fundamental processes such as dispersal, diversity and population dynamics of islands with regards to their area and distance from other islands or the mainland. Theoretically, forest fragments take on the characteristics of habitat islands in proportion to their degree of and length of time of isolation (Harris 1984). Island biogeography theory and lessons learned from true-island biogeography provide a basis for developing a management strategy and addressing specific decision variables, such as reserve patch size, distribution, placement and protective measures (Harris 1984). Nevertheless, a notable difference between oceanic islands and terrestrial islands, or fragments, is the existence of land surrounding or between the fragments, referred to as the matrix. The impacts of use and management of this space is a continued subject of study.

Observations of edge effects on habitats are also important, if not integral, to the study of fragmentation effects. A slew of changes in habitat and trophic interactions have been observed to magnify as distance from habitat edge decreases, such as nest predation, decreased humidity and soil moisture, sunlight, decreased species richness and changes in species constitution. The degree of these impacts on fragments continues to be studied. Due to the generally high ratio of edge to habitat area in fragments, edges are presumed to have detrimental consequences for the organisms that inhabit forest fragments.

These concepts have largely inspired the SLOSS (single large or several small) reserve size debate, which the Minimal Critical Size of Ecosystem Project (now known as the BDFFP) attempts to address. The SLOSS debate is an ongoing interdisciplinary discussion in which the scientific community attempts to understand and weigh the pros and cons of different reserve size and distribution, for successful ecosystem conservation: single large reserve, or several small ones? Increasing and widespread habitat loss and fragmentation, along with the SLOSS debate, have led to the questions the BDFFP originally sought to answer. Overall, Lovejoy’s goal in establishing the project was to determine necessary reserve size and placement for successful habitat and species conservation, hence the original name of the project. According to Bierregaard's book, Lessons from Amazonia, Lovejoy worked off of the Island Biogeography Theory and asked three key questions:

1. What effect does fragment size have on the rate of species extinction?
2. Would the local extinction rate eventually slow and halt, equalizing the number of species?
3. How do species interactions and demography change as a result of reduced habitat?

Since then, studies conducted on the BDFFP site have varied enormously in terms of their principal goals and hypotheses (Laurance and Bierregaard 1997). Along with reserve size, placement and distribution, it is also important to understand and properly manage the links between habitat fragmentation and ecosystem persistence (Bierregaard 2001). Studies on edge effects, extinction rates, biotic and abiotic interactions, mortality factors, soil quality and more performed on this site address fragmentation effects on biodiversity and other ecological changes. Other dimensions influencing ecosystems are also studied, such as economic and human factors. Many studies in BDFFP also attempt to find ways to apply research to restoration, conservation and management practices of tropical forests. The original core question of minimum ecosystem reserve size has initiated an incredible variety of research that continues to grow and diversify.

== Study area ==
The BDFFP spans approximately 1,000 km^{2} of the Brazilian Amazon region located 70 km north of Manaus, Brazil in South America. This particular area of South America is famous for its tropical forests and climate, as well as high levels of wildlife diversity.

The BDFFP Area of Relevant Ecological Interest, which contains the study areas, is divided between the municipalities of Manaus (3.61%) and Rio Preto da Eva (96.39%). It has a total area of 3,288 hectares (8,120 acres). The research area is about 80 kilometres (50 mi) north of the city of Manaus.

On average, the Amazon Basin ranges from 1,900 to 2,500 millimeters of rainfall annually, while the mean annual temperature is 26 °C with a prominent dry season from June through October. Another distinct feature of the forests in the BDFFP is the canopy, which can reach from 30 to 37 meters with some emergents reaching up to 55 meters. These forests, dominated primarily by palms in the understory, are home to over 1200 species of trees in at least 64 families.

The BDFFP reserves are found in non-flooded tropical lowland rainforest where soils are nutrient-poor and the topography ranges from 50 to 150 m in elevation. Although the area is relatively flat, it includes three large cattle ranges and contains 11 forest fragments, ranging from 1-100 hectares, surrounded by continuous forest that acts as an experimental controls (Laurance 2011).

For detailed images of the study area, visit the INPA maps

In the early 1980s, clearing and burning led to fragment isolation of about 80 – 650 meters from the surrounding intact forest, a procedure that was continued several times throughout the experiment due to successful regrowth of secondary forests (Laurance 2011). The final reserve isolation took place in 1990 with the successful felling and burning of a 200-meter-wide strip around the Dimona reserve.

An important characteristic of the diversity of the Amazon Basin is that many species are rare or distributed erratically throughout the Amazonian forest. This introduces a phenomenon known as the "sample effect", which suggests that the absence of species from the experimental fragments may be due to the fact that they were not present during fragment creation rather than from vanishment (Laurance 2011). This effect is essential to understanding the effects of forest fragmentation because small fragments cannot sustain large populations due to competition for resources and habitat loss. Therefore, in the experiment, it is unlikely that species not present at the beginning of the experiment will appear in these smaller fragments. Some organisms, however, remain stable and even favor disturbed areas. Leaf bryophytes, wandering spiders and frogs are among the species that remain stable while gap-favoring species include hummingbirds, butterflies, and lianas. Because the matrix surrounding isolated fragments is not completely inhospitable to some species, it is important to understanding how native wildlife can use these human-altered habitats as corridors for dispersal or reproduction.

== Example studies ==
There has been a broad scope of studies performed on the BDFFP site focusing on many elements of fragmentation effects on organisms and habitat conditions. Subjects from a range of biota are studied, including trees and other flora, microorganisms, and a variety vertebrate and invertebrates. Soil chemistry and development, as well as human and environmental factors in fragments have also been researched. Some notable studies performed on the BDFFP site are summarized below.

=== Edge effects ===
Edge effects is a general term for the impacts of different habitats at or near the barrier where they meet, the "edge". They are an important factor in many habitats, especially when it comes to fragmented habitats, and are studied extensively in the field. One major study performed on this subject was "Edge-related changes in environment and plant responses due to forest fragmentation in central Amazonia" by Valerie Kapos, Elisa Wandelli, Jose Luis Camargo, and Gislene Ganade. The following was summarized from pages 33 to 44 of Tropical Forest Remnants: Ecology, Management and Conservation of Fragmented Communities by W.F. Laurance and R.O. Bierregaard.

A major change brought about by habitat fragmentation is an increase in the proportion of edge exposed to other habitats, and the importance of this change depends to a degree on the contrast between the fragmented habitat and the matrix in which it occurs. Edge effects play an important role in the regional environment as well, with the Amazon forests helping maintain hydrological cycles through their roles in evapotranspiration and soil protection. Depending on the extent to which the influence of desiccating edge-effect conditions from the clearings (matrix) penetrates into the forest and on how plants respond to it, forest fragments might be expected to evapotranspire more than equivalent areas of continuous forest. Therefore, this research focused on assessing the edge related gradients of factors that affect evapotranspiration in forest fragments, and plant responses to them. Changes in edge effects with time were also studied.

Temperature, vapor pressure deficit (VPD), and soil moisture were the factors surveyed. The study compared measurements made at different distances along transects from the western isolated edge toward the center of the reserve with measurements made in control areas more than 500m from the forest edge. Understory plant/water relations were monitored in dry seasons, soil moisture measurements were made over ten months, understory plant distributions were measured, microclimatic and leaf expansion studies were done, as well as vegetation structure studies, all between 1988 and 1990.

In both wet and dry seasons, soil moisture in the edge transects was similar to that in the control areas except at the edge itself and in the region between 40 and 80 m from edge. Soil water potentials below wilting point occurred in the forest during dry season, but the driest points were not necessarily near the edge and no evidence of prolonged drought was found. Thus, any edge drought effects on plants must be due to combined effects of reduced soil moisture and higher atmospheric demand exceeding the supplying power of vascular systems, rather ecosystem-level water shortage.

Plant responses: For leaf expansion in Duguetia, there was no difference in the rate of leaf expansion between plants in edge zones and those in control areas. When looking at whether canopy trees close their stomata to reduce water loss as a response to the changed environment, they found no difference between these two locations. They looked at the same response in understory plants, and found the results might suggest that the understory species did have greater water use efficiencies near the forest edge. This pattern could be explained by either greater mixing of air from outside the forest with the understory air or lower decomposition rates, or both, near the edge. Vegetation structure was also analyzed. They found clear edge-related gradients in environmental factors gave way to more complex patterns, which suggested some influence of the edge. Although there was little evidence of edge effecting plant water status, distribution of at least one understory species suggests proximity to edge is disadvantageous.

Some general implications suggested by this study are edge effects on environmental variables become more complex as edge ages. These complex patterns and plant responses to them are likely strongly influenced by frequent gaps near edges, changing vegetation structure and continuing to alter the nature and extent of edge effects. Management decisions based on edge effects should incorporate understanding of the mechanisms behind those effects, and long term studies are necessary to determine those mechanisms and their changes over time.

=== Effects on fauna ===
Many studies have been conducted about the fragmentation effects on vertebrates and invertebrates, including amphibians, insects, mammals and birds. This study, “Understory birds and dynamic habitat mosaics in Amazonian rainforests” by Richard Bierregaard and Philip C. Stouffer is a long term experiment studying birds in a dynamic system of small forests remnants surrounded by pasture or abandoned pasture undergoing secondary succession. The following was summarized from pages 138 to 155 of Tropical Forest Remnants: Ecology, Management and Conservation of Fragmented Communities by W.F. Laurance and R.O. Bierregaard.

Within a series of 1 and 10 hectare and one 100 hectare fragments, mark-recapture program was conducted focusing on understory birds to reveal changes in species composition and activity level. Analysis of broadly defined ecological guilds was performed, including nectar feeders, insectivores, and frugivores. They related changes in the fragment avifauna to remnant size, time since isolation, and the nature of the surrounding vegetation.

For insectivores, abundance and species richness of most frequently captured birds declined significantly in post-isolation reserves. The obligate army ant-following species disappeared completely from 1 and 10 ha isolates within 2 years of isolation. As with insectivores, frugivores showed significant declines in capture rates after isolation and four species showed effects of time since isolation. Nectarivores, such as understory hummingbirds, proved to be less vulnerable to fragmentation than insectivores and frugivores.

Birds play an integral role in tropical rainforest ecosystems and are likely the best studied group of organisms in these forests, so they provide an excellent opportunity to understand faunal responses to habitat fragmentation. This study identified both particularly sensitive and insensitive groups of species. These are first steps in developing understanding needed to minimize effects humans are having on tropical rainforest ecosystems.

== Future ==
What started out as a five-person initiative slowly gained momentum as funding for the BDFFP grew and became a successful midsize research project operated by a larger staff. This growth has allowed for continuous large-scale inventories of species’ response to fragmentation, which is a main focal point of research concerning future conservation.

One of the major advantages of this study is that it has been conducted very consistently over a long period of time. Experimentation over several decades allows for the occurrence of natural events, such as El Niño droughts, which are important facilitators of natural disturbance that could affect fragmentation.

Much more needs to be understood about forest fragments, however. As BDFFP data suggests, even small fragments can take centuries to stabilize their floristic composition and carbon storage after experiencing dramatic ecological changes (Laurance 2011).

The fundamental goals drawn from the BDFFP experiment are to preserve larger areas of land to ensure viable populations are maintained and to maintain the forests’ natural ecological processes. Due to the continuing impacts of deforestation on tropical forest composition and processes, it can be said that the ecological future of the Amazonian region is greatly tied to its economic future. Efforts should continue to be made in order to prevent disastrous edge effects resulting from fires, climate change, and human impact from commercial hunting and logging.

Over 30 years of research and data collection with the BDFFP experiment has led to many discoveries and important lessons for scientists, but has also faced many challenges, such as funding. Since the late 1990s, colonization and hunting have emerged as direct threats to the BDFFP. The paving of the 1100-km-long Manaus-Venezuela highway has increased forest colonization and logging (Laurance 2011). As the influx of humans continues into these lands, the conservation efforts of the BDFFP become increasingly important in order to prevent devastating effects on the surrounding forest ecosystems.

== See also ==
- Landscape ecology
- Patch dynamics
- SLOSS debate

== Bibliography ==
- ARIE Proj. Dinâmica B. de Fragmentos Florestais (in Portuguese), ISA: Instituto Socioambiental
- Bradshaw, G. A.; P. A. Marquet; Kathryn L. Ronnenberg (2003). "Biological Dynamics of Forest Fragments Projects History and Study SItes". How Landscapes Change: Human Disturbance and Ecosystem Fragmentation in the Americas: 34–36.
- Bierregaard, R. O.; W.F. Laurence (1997). Tropical forest remnants: Ecology, management, and conservation of fragmented communities. University of Chicago Press.
- Kress, W. John; W. R. Heyer; P. Acevedo; J. Coddington; D. Cole; T. L. Erwin; B. J. Meggers; M. Pogue; R. W. Thorington; R. P. Vari; M. J. Weitzman; S. H. Weitzman (1998). "Amazonian biodiversity: Assessing conservation priorities with taxonomic data" (PDF). Biodiversity and Conservation. 7 (12): 1577–1587. doi:10.1023/a:1008889803319. S2CID 30559965.
- Quammen, David (1996). The Song of the Dodo: Island Biogeography in an Age of Extinctions. Scribner. ISBN 0-684-80083-7.
- Kolbert, Elizabeth. The Sixth Extinction: An Unnatural History – Henry Holt, USA 2014 – ISBN 978-0-8050-9299-8
