= Cultural keystone species =

Concept in ecology

A cultural keystone species is one which is of exceptional significance to a particular culture or a people. Such species can be identified by their prevalence in language, cultural practices (e.g. ceremonies), traditions, diet, medicines, material items, and histories of a community. These species influence social systems and culture and are a key feature of a community's identity.

The concept was first proposed by Gary Nabhan and John Carr in 1994 and later described by Sergio Cristancho and Joanne Vining in 2000 and by ethnobotanist Ann Garibaldi and ethnobiologist Nancy Turner in 2004. It is a "metaphorical parallel" to the ecological keystone species concept, and may be useful for biodiversity conservation and ecological restoration.

== Definitions ==
The exact definition of cultural keystone species remains under debate and is considered to be more abstract than the related ecological concept. Garibaldi and Turner emphasize that the cultural keystone species concept is not an extension of ecological keystone species, but rather a parallel concept that bridges social and physical sciences, as well as indigenous knowledge and western knowledge, to offer a more holistic approach. Other researchers debate whether or not cultural keystone species are different from economically important species. Additionally, it is argued that the concept will be reduced to a biological term if it only focuses on specific species, but this may be solved by considering cultural keystone species as a "complex" that develops based on the ways that the species is used and its impacts on cultural practices over time, through conscious social practices, decision-making processes, and changes to societal needs and practices.

Garibaldi and Turner outline six elements that should be considered when identifying a cultural keystone species:

- The magnitude and variety of ways the species is used
- The species' influence on language
- The species' role in cultural practices (e.g. traditional practices, ceremonies)
- The continuation of the species' importance even as cultural identity changes over time
- The irreplaceability of the species by another species accessible to the group
- The species' role in activities outside its own territory (e.g. trade)

Loring argues that this framing misses an essential feature of the cultural keystone concept as originally conceived by Nabhan and Carr: that the importance of the relationship flows in both directions. In other words, a cultural keystone species is not just important culturally; the species, and the cultural practices that surround it, are also essential to the health and structure of the broader ecosystem. They are, in Loring's words, "a point of convergence... where our intersections are intrinsically powerful, meaningful and symbolic."

Not all cultural keystone species are beneficial to a community or an ecosystem, particularly when the species is considered invasive. One example of this is the Australian Eucalyptus tree that is now widespread in California and is considered to be culturally important because of its aesthetic value and dietary uses. However, the tree is a threat to native species and has drastically impacted the ecosystems it is found in.

== Significance ==
The cultural keystone species concept may have important applications for conservation and ecological restoration initiatives because these species may serve as a starting point from which to identify the needs of both the community and the ecosystem. Cultural keystone species reinforce the close relationships between communities and their surrounding environments, particularly for indigenous communities currently facing environmental and economic challenges. These species may offer information about an ecosystem or a community's resilience, and their identification can support the survival of communities who depend on a cultural keystone species. It is argued that these species should play a role in environmental policy, for example in the Cultural Impact Assessment of the United Nations Environment Programme, to connect cultural and ecological conservation for indigenous peoples. Legal recognition of cultural keystone species can also improve social justice, ensure continuation of indigenous practices, and promote inclusive social-ecological management practices.

Researchers have also found that identification of cultural keystone species supports the integration of indigenous perspectives on environmental stewardship and improved natural resource management practices. The application of the concept can support the development of innovative methods to conserve natural resources as a result of this integration. Additionally, "invisible losses" can be avoided because the identification of these species includes consideration of the cultural and social importance of a species. Some controversies around the topic have been highlighted by Martin A. Nuñez and Dan Simberloff, emphasizing that many problematic non-native invasive species have been incorporated in some societies as cultural keystone species.

== Examples in North America ==
=== White pine ===
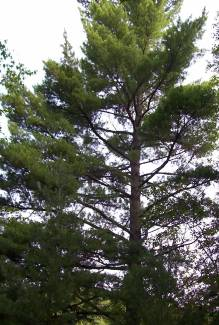
Eastern white pine, a cultural keystone species for the Kitcisakik Algonquin community

The white pine (Pinus strobus L.), found across northeastern North America, is a cultural keystone species for the Kitcisakik Algonquin community in Quebec. The tree is prevalent in legends and myths that are central to the culture, history, and identity of the Kitcisakik. The tree is said to offer protection to the people because of its large size when mature, and provides a home to bald eagles, a sacred species for Algonquin societies. Parts of the tree are also used in material goods and medicines, and the species is considered to be irreplaceable by the Kitcisakik, who rely on the services the white pine offers to both humans and the environment.

The white pine is currently threatened by logging and environmental changes and the Kitcisakik are central in efforts to modify practices so that the species will survive. The researchers that identified the white pine as the cultural keystone species of the Kitcisakik using Garibaldi and Turner's methodology and community interviews note that the tree is not only culturally significant, but ecologically as well - it provides services to animals such as birds, moose, and marten. The identification of this tree as a cultural keystone species offers insight into how and why culturally important components of the environment should be considered when developing natural resource management and restoration strategies. The inclusion of the white pine's cultural significance in these strategies may ensure that cultural needs are considered alongside environmental and economic priorities.

=== Western red-cedar ===
Western red-cedar (Thuja plicata) is a cultural keystone species for the First Nations cultures of the Pacific Northwest Coast of North America, such as the Tsimshian, Haida, Heiltsuk, and Kwakwaka’wakw. It provides wood, bark, and roots for various uses such as canoes, clothing, baskets, and ceremonies. It is considered a sacred gift from the Creator and features in many stories and rituals.

=== Red laver seaweed ===
Red laver seaweed (Porphyra abbottiae) is a cultural keystone species for the Coast Tsimshian, Haida, Heiltsuk, Kwakwaka’wakw, and other coastal peoples of British Columbia. It is harvested, dried, and eaten as a nutritious food. It requires detailed knowledge and skills to collect and process, and is valued as a trade item and a medicine. It is also associated with seasonal indicators, taboos, and narratives.

=== Wapato ===
Wapato (Sagittaria latifolia) is a cultural keystone species for the Katzie and other Sto:lo peoples of British Columbia. It is an aquatic plant that produces edible tubers. It was formerly a staple food and trade item for many groups, especially the Katzie. It was cultivated and managed in wetlands, but its use declined with the introduction of the potato and the loss of habitat.
