= Reserve design =

Planning of naturve reserves

Reserve design is the process of planning and creating a nature reserve in a way that effectively accomplishes the goal of the reserve.

Reserve establishment has a variety of goals, and planners must consider many factors for a reserve to be successful. These include habitat preference, migration, climate change, and public support. To accommodate these factors and fulfill the reserve's goal requires that planners create and implement a specific design.

== Purpose of reserves ==
All nature reserves have a primary goal of protecting biodiversity from harmful activities and processes, both natural and anthropogenic. To achieve this, reserves must extensively sample biodiversity at all taxonomic levels and enhance and ensure long-term survival of the organisms. As it is described in the guides to nature reserve establishment from Scottish and English governments, a nature reserve will likely contribute to enhancing local sustainability and contribute to meeting biodiversity targets. An additional goal is also included: providing controlled opportunities for study of organisms and their surroundings, where study can mean actual scientific research or use of the reserve for education, engagement and recreation of public. Various secondary benefits, such as economic contributions from enhanced tourism and opportunities for specialist training, are also mentioned.

== Social and ecological factors ==
Successful reserves incorporate important ecological and social factors into their design. Such factors include the natural range of predators. When a reserve is too small, carnivores have increased contact with humans, resulting in higher mortality rates for the carnivore.

Also certain species are area sensitive. A study on song birds in Japan showed that certain birds only settle in habitats much larger than the area they actually occupy. Knowing species geographic range and preference is essential to determining the size of the reserve needed.

Social factors such as the attitudes of local people should also be taken into account. If a reserve is put up in an area that people depend on for their livelihood the reserve often fails. For example, in Bolivia, the Amboró National Park was expanded in 1991 from 1,800 to 6,370 km². While this was celebrated by conservationists, local people who would be displaced by the expansion were angered. They continued to hunt and log within the park and eventually the park size had to be reduced [8]. Because local people were not considered in the design of the reserve, conservation efforts failed. Many conservationists advocate local people must be included in conservation efforts, this is known as an Integrated Conservation and Development Project.

== Design solutions ==
=== Reserve shape ===
As commonly recommended, an ideal nature reserve should obtain a shape of a perfect circle to reduce dispersal distances avoid detrimental edge effects. However, this is practically very hard to achieve, due to land use for agriculture, human settlements and natural resource extraction. Buffer zones are often suggested as a way of providing protection from human threat, promoting succession and reforestation, and reducing edge effects. English government guide to nature reserves mentions buffer zones as being useful, but not essential for biodiversity protection.

Contrasting evidence suggests that shape plays little to no part in the effectiveness of the reserve. A study in 1985 explored the effects of shape and size on islands, and determined that area, rather than shape was the major factor.

=== Reserve size ===
A complicated debate among conservation biologists (also known as the SLOSS debate) focused on whether it is better to create one large or several small reserves. The species area relationship $S=cA^z$ states that the number of species in a habitat is directly proportional to its size. So theoretically if several small reserves have a greater total area than a single large reserve, the small reserves will contain a greater total number of species. This, combined with assumptions of island biogeography theory, lead Jared Diamond to state that a single large reserve is the best method of conservation, and it is still commonly recommended. For example, a review by Ovaskainen determined that a single large reserve site is best at maximising long-term survival of the species and deferring extinction in a closed population.

The nested subset theory disagrees with Diamond's conclusion. It states that several small reserves will mostly share the same species, because certain species are better adapted to living in smaller habitats and many other species only exist in larger habitats A study conducted in Illinois had shown that two small forest reserves contained a larger number of bird species than one large forest patch, but the large reserve contained a larger number of migratory birds. Ovaskainen and Fukamachi argued that several small reserve fragments are better at maximising species richness. However, it will most likely only applies to common species, as the rarest, least abundant species are found only in single large sites.

As the debate had mixed evidence supporting both Single Large and Several Small reserves, some scientists questioned the practical applicability of island biogeography theory to conservation in general. However, its applicability and its role in stimulating the study of habitat fragmentation is now largely accepted. The scientific findings emerging from habitat fragmentation research are considered to be a key element of conservation biology and applicable to reserve design. Similarly, the suggestion that scientific evidence was lacking to support the hypothesis that subdividing habitat increases extinction rates (fundamentally the problem addressed by the SLOSS debate) was refuted.

=== Habitat quality and heterogeneity ===
The science of reserve design has faced some recent controversy regarding species-area relationship, when it was shown that habitat heterogeneity is likely a stronger factor in determining species richness than area. The study decoupled area and habitat complexity to show that small, but heterogeneous habitats have more arthropod species than large, but homogeneous ones.

Habitat diversity and quality have also been shown to influence biodiversity. It was discovered that plant species richness in Norwegian meadows is correlated with habitat diversity. Another study has found that butterfly population persistence was found to correlate with habitat quality, rather than area.

Empathetic Architecture - How can we produces buildings in a reserve to allow empathy within the physical environment of the structure? The term empathy is understood primarily from sociology referring to an interrelation with another person. By Association, whether positive or negative, it is subjective to some extent. In architectural terms, empathy is understood as a positive bond with the built environment. The more people can associate with the built environment the better they are able to understand the world they live in and we as architects must interpret such techniques and by application when used effectively, can achieve breakthrough designs in potentially shorter cycles to create spaces of greater use.

=== Reserve networks ===
Protecting species in a confined area sometimes isn't enough to protect the biodiversity of an entire region. Life within a nature reserve does not function as an isolated unit, separate from its surroundings. Many animals engage in migration and are not guaranteed to stay within fixed reserve boundaries. So, to protect biodiversity over wide geographic ranges, reserve systems are established. Reserve systems are a series of strategically placed reserves designed to connect habitats. This allows animals to travel between protected areas through wildlife corridors. A wildlife corridor is a protected passageway where it is known that fauna migrate. The Yellowstone to Yukon Conservation Initiative is an excellent example of this type of conservation effort. Studies showed that reserve networks are extremely valuable for conservation, and can help increase migration between patches up to 50%.

== Reserve location ==
To be efficient and cost-effective, yet still effectively protect a wide range of organisms, nature reserves must be established in species rich geographic locations. This potentially includes biodiversity hotspots, ancient woodland, and unique habitats such as wetlands, bogs, ecosites or endemic islands (e.g. Madagascar).

=== Biodiversity hotspots ===
According to Conservation International, the term biodiversity hotspot refers to "the richest and most threatened reservoirs of plant and animal life on Earth... To qualify as a hotspot, a region must meet two strict criteria: it must contain at least 1,500 species of vascular plants (> 0.5 percent of the world's total) as endemics, and it has to have lost at least 70 percent of its original habitat." These hotspots are rapidly disappearing due to human activities, but they still have a chance of being saved if conservation measures are enacted. Biodiversity hotspots could be considered the most important places to put reserves.

== Future habitat ==
Future habitat of the species we wish to protect is of utmost importance when designing reserves. There are many questions to think about when determining future species ranges: How will the climate shift in the future? Where will species move? What species will climate change benefit? What are potential barriers to these needed species range shifts? Reserves must be designed with future habitat in mind, perhaps incorporating both the current and future ranges of the species' of concern.

The fundamental question in determining future species ranges is how the Earth is changing, both in the present and how it will change in the future. According to the United States Environmental Protection Agency the average surface temperature of the Earth has raised 1.2 – 1.4 °F since 1900. 1 °F of this warming has occurred since the mid-1970s, and at present, the Earth's surface is heating up about 0.32 °F per decade. Predicted increases in global temperature range from 1.4 °C to 5.8 °C by the year 2100. Large changes in precipitation are also predicted to occur by both the A1Fl scenario and the B1 scenario It is predicted that there will also be large changes in the atmosphere and in the sea level..

This rapid, dramatic climate change has affected and will continue to affect species ranges. A study by Camille Parmesan and Gary Yohe published in 2003 illustrates this point well. 434 of the species analysed were characterized as having changed their ranges. 80% of observed range changes were made polewards or upward, as predicted by global climate change, at an average of 6.1 km per decade. A more recent study in 2011 confirmed this trend and showed that the rate of range shift is at least two times higher than estimated in previous studies. With the polewards movement, species abandon their previous habitat areas in search of cooler environments. An example of this was species of sea anemones thriving in Monterey Bay that had previously had a more southerly distribution. Species of lichens, and butterflies in Europe also followed the patterns of species range shifts predicted by models of future climate change.

These species were shown to be migrating northward and upward, to higher latitudes and sky islands. The data from this study also indicated "the dynamics at the range boundaries are expected to be more influenced by climate than are dynamics within the interior of a species range…[where] response to global warming predicts that southerly species should outperform northerly species at the same site."

These findings are of particular interest when considering reserve design. At the edges of a reserve, presuming that the reserve is also the species range if the species is highly threatened, climate change will be far more of a factor. Northern borders and those at higher elevations will become future battlegrounds for the conservation of the species in question, as they migrate northward and upward. The borders of today may not include the habitat of tomorrow, thus defeating the purpose of preservation by instead making the species range smaller and smaller if there are barriers to migration at the Northern and higher elevation boundaries of the reserve. Reserves could be designed to keep Northern migration a possibility, with boundaries farther to the North than might be considered practical looking at the today's species ranges and abundances. Keeping open corridors between reserves connecting them to reserves to the North and the South is another possibility.

== See also ==
- Biodiversity
- Biodiversity hotspot
- Conservation biology
- Endemism
- IUCN protected area categories
- Marine park
- Marine protected area
- National park
- Nature reserve
- SLOSS debate
- Wildlife corridor
