= Biological Dynamics of Forest Fragments Project Area of Relevant Ecological Interest =

- Área de Relevante Interesse Ecológico Projeto Dinâmica Biológica de Fragmentos Florestais
- IUCN category IV (habitat/species management area)
- Location within Brazil
- Nearest city: Rio Preto da Eva, Amazonas
- Coordinates: 2.417927°S 59.843153°W
- Area: 3,288 hectares (8,120 acres)
- Designation: Area of relevant ecological interest
- Created: 5 November 1985
- Administrator: Chico Mendes Institute for Biodiversity Conservation

The Biological Dynamics of Forest Fragments Project Area of Relevant Ecological Interest (Portuguese: Área de Relevante Interesse Ecológico Projeto Dinâmica Biológica de Fragmentos Florestais: ARIE-PDBFF) is an area of relevant ecological interest in the state of Amazonas, Brazil. It is the location of the Biological Dynamics of Forest Fragments Project, which explores the effects of habitat fragmentation and the processes of regeneration of forest fragments isolated by human activity.

== Location ==
The Biological Dynamics of Forest Fragments Project Area of Relevant Ecological Interest (ARIE-PDBFF) is divided between the municipalities of Manaus (3.61%) and Rio Preto da Eva (96.39%) in Amazonas, with a total area of 3,288 hectares (8,120 acres). The research area is about 80 kilometres (50 mi) north of the city of Manaus. The Rio Urubu State Forest lies to the north. The BR-174 highway divides the ARIE, which is mostly on the east of the highway. Two small segments are on the west side of the highway in the Rio Negro Left Bank Environmental Protection Area.

The ARIE-PDBFF includes a total of 23 nature reserves in 11 forest fragments, including isolated reserves surrounded by pasture or secondary growth and non-isolated areas that are still part of large tracts of continuous forest. There are seven camps in the ARIE, each with sleeping areas, laboratory, kitchen and toilets. The ARIE lies within an area of 20 by 50 kilometres (12 by 31 mi) in the SUFRAMA Agricultural District.

== History ==
The Biological Dynamics of Forest Fragments Project began its research in 1979. The Biological Dynamics of Forest Fragments Project Area of Relevant Ecological Interest was created by federal decree 91.884 of 5 November 1985. The ARIE is managed by the Chico Mendes Institute for Biodiversity Conservation (ICMBio) in cooperation with the National Institute of Amazonian Research and the Smithsonian Institution of the United States. Only scientific research is allowed. The ARIE became part of the Central Amazon Ecological Corridor, created in 2002. The consultative council was created on 21 July 2015.

== Environment ==
The average altitude is 80 to 100 metres (260 to 330 ft) above sea level. The terrain consists of plateaus cut by small stream and creeks that form flooded areas in some parts. The ARIE-PDBFF has a Köppen climate classification of "Afi", with temperatures ranging from 19 to 21 °C (66 to 70 °F) up to 35 to 39 °C (95 to 102 °F), and average temperatures of 26 °C (79 °F). Annual rainfall is 1,900 to 2,300 millimetres (75 to 91 in), with the rainy season from December to April and the dry season from May to November.

Vegetation is dense rainforest with a fairly uniform canopy of about 30 to 35 metres (98 to 115 ft) in height with the occasional emergent tree rising to as high as 55 metres (180 ft). The local landscape includes protected areas and several areas of pasture, either in use or abandoned and in various stages of regeneration. This provides a unique opportunity to study the forest regeneration process. 56 families of trees have been identified with over 1000 species. Animal species include frogs (51), lizards (24), snakes (63), birds (370) and mammals (52).

== Sources ==
- ARIE Proj. Dinâmica B. de Fragmentos Florestais (in Portuguese), ISA: Instituto Socioambiental
- CEC Central da Amazônia (in Portuguese), ISA: Instituto Socioambiental
- Reserva de Fragmentos Florestais (in Portuguese), PELD: Pesquisas Ecológicas de Longa Duração, Instituto Nacional de Pesquisas da Amazônia, archived from the original on 2016-09-06
