= Rio Urubu State Forest =

State forest in Amazonas, Brazil

- Floresta Estadual do Rio Urubu
- IUCN category VI (protected area with sustainable use of natural resources)
- Location within Brazil
- Nearest city: Rio Preto da Eva, Amazonas
- Coordinates: 2°18′28″S 59°47′46″W
- Area: 27,342 hectares (67,560 acres)
- Designation: State forest
- Created: 22 December 2003
- Administrator: Secretaria de Estado do Meio Ambiente do Amazonas

The Rio Urubu State Forest (Portuguese: Floresta Estadual do Rio Urubu) is a state forest in the state of Amazonas, Brazil.

== Location ==
The Rio Urubu State Forest is in the municipality of Rio Preto da Eva, Amazonas. It has an area of 27,342 hectares (67,560 acres). The forest is about 84 kilometres (52 mi) north of Manaus, east of highway BR-174 and south of AM-240. The Caverna do Maroaga Environmental Protection Area is to the north, and the Biological Dynamics of Forest Fragments Project Area of Relevant Ecological Interest is to the south. The Urubu River forms the northeast boundary of the forest.

== History ==
The Rio Urubu State Forest was created by state decree 23.993 of 22 December 2003. Objectives were to manage use of natural resources, maintain and protect water resources and biodiversity, recover areas of degraded land, conduct scientific research and environmental education, and support sustainable development of natural resources in the surrounding areas. The forest became part of the Central Amazon Ecological Corridor, created in 2002.

== Environment ==
The forest is in the interfluvial region between the Rio Negro and the Uatumã River. About half of the terrain is slopes cut by streams. Features include extensive areas of buriti palms in the Urubu River floodplain, rapids and waterfalls of great scenic beauty. Vegetation is mostly intact primary terra firma rainforest, with trees up to 37 metres (121 ft) tall. The area is among the most diverse in tree species of all tropical forests in the world. Common tree species are Couroupita guianensis, Dinizia excelsa, Hevea brasiliensis, Aniba rosaeodora, Licaria brasiliensis, Aniba canelilla and Dipteryx odorata. The rich fauna includes rare species such as harpy eagle (Harpia harpyja), grey-winged trumpeter (Psophia crepitans), Guyanan red howler (Alouatta macconnelli) and red-handed tamarin (Saguinus midas).

There are three settlements in the forest. The forest has a detailed plan for a special economic zone with potential activities including large-scale timber extraction by private companies or local communities, extraction of non-timber products, with the possibility of a community management model, ecotourism, scientific research and conservation.

== Sources ==
- CEC Central da Amazônia (in Portuguese), ISA: Instituto Socioambiental
- Eduardo Braga (22 December 2003), Decreto Estadual n.º 23.993, de 22 de Dezembro de 2003 (in Portuguese)
- FES do Rio Urubu (in Portuguese), ISA: Instituto Socioambiental
- Floresta Estadual do Rio Urubu (in Portuguese), Via Rural, archived from the original on October 21, 2016
