= Biological Invasions =

- Discipline: Ecology
- Language: English
- Edited by: Daniel Simberloff

Publication details
- Publisher: Springer Science+Business Media
- Frequency: Monthly
- Open access: Hybrid
- Impact factor: 3.133 (2020)

Standard abbreviations
- ISO 4: Biol. Invasions

Indexing
- ISSN: 1387-3547 (print); 1573-1464 (web)
- OCLC no.: 42805212

Links
- Journal homepage

Biological Invasions is a peer-reviewed scientific journal on invasion biology published by Springer Science+Business Media.

== Abstracting and indexing ==
The journal is abstracted and indexed in Scopus and the Science Citation Index Expanded. According to the Journal Citation Reports, the journal has a 2020 impact factor of 3.133.
