= Daniel Simberloff =

American ecologist and professor

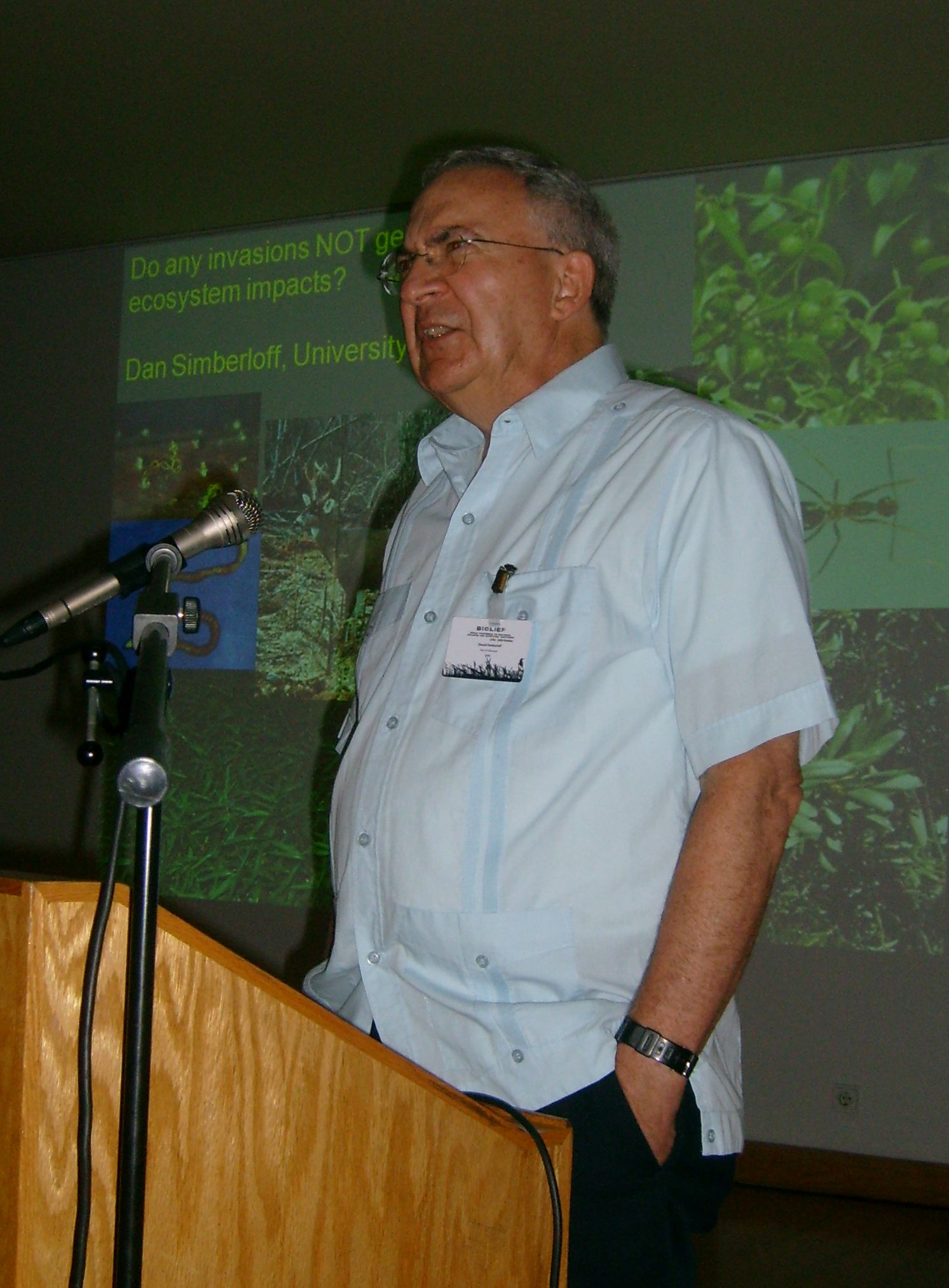
- Daniel Simberloff in 2009.
- Education: Harvard University (BA, PhD)
- Known for: Invasion biology
- Scientific career
- Fields: Ecology; Biology
- Workplaces: University of Tennessee; Florida State University
- Doctoral advisor: E. O. Wilson

Daniel Simberloff is an American biologist and ecologist. He earned his Ph.D. from Harvard University in 1969. He is currently Gore Hunger Professor of Environmental Science at the University of Tennessee, editor-in-chief of the journal Biological Invasions, and a member of the National Academy of Sciences of the USA.

== Early life and education ==
Simberloff received his Bachelor of Arts from Harvard College in 1964, and his Ph.D. in biology from Harvard University in 1969. He wanted to go to graduate school for mathematics, but changed his mind after taking a major biology course from future Nobel Prize winner, George Wald.

== Career ==
Simberloff was a faculty member at Florida State University from 1968-1997 before relocating to the University of Tennessee, Knoxville. He is currently a distinguished professor there in the Department of Ecology and Evolutionary Biology. His more recent work focuses on the presence of invasive species, and raises the "specter of 'invasional meltdown'". At present, Simberloff has a long-term project in Patagonia on the invasion of conifer trees, involving introduced deer, boar, and fungi. Simberloff has a total of over 350 publications, and he is currently working on several papers on invasive biology.

== Academic Work ==
Simberloff's doctoral dissertation tested the theory of island biogeography proposed by Robert H. MacArthur and Edward O. Wilson, resulting in a paper that won the Ecological Society of America's Mercer Award in 1971 and was included as one of forty classic papers that represented the foundations of ecology. He began to be concerned that most mathematical models "more or less fit some data but had no reason to be the preferred explanation." He showed that a random draw could explain some patterns having to do with island biota. Meanwhile, a number of biologists, such as Jared Diamond, began calling for island biogeography theory to be applied in conservation. This became a controversy in ecology known as the SLOSS debate. In his 1976 Science paper, Simberloff contradicted his own theory, claiming that most of the insect turnover in the assemblages studied was ephemeral and did not, therefore, confirm island biogeography theory in general. In fact, two smaller areas could mathematically support more species than a single area of the same size, and he had experimental data from his mangrove studies to support it. A leading proponent of the theory now writes that "the species-area curve is a blunt tool in many contexts" and "now seems simplistic to the point of being cartoonish" when it comes to management of nature preserves.

Simberloff then took on the MacArthurian paradigm of competitively structured communities, championing the use of null models in community ecology. Debate on the subject in the ecological literature became so heated that it inspired the name of "Tallahassee mafia" for Simberloff and his associates at Florida State University. Its high points were a set of papers in a philosophical journal, an entire issue of The American Naturalist, and a published symposium at Wakulla Springs, Florida, that changed the face of the field. Simberloff caused ecologists to ask "what would happen if one mechanism were removed?" He preached, "rely on the data to tell you how nature operates; don't simply find the patterns that you're supposed to find." The Ecological Society of America conferred on him its 2006 Eminent Ecologist Award for his "outstanding body of ecological work" and "contributions of extraordinary merit," citing him in particular for having been "the quintessential ecological iconoclast."

== Other professional work ==
Simberloff was instrumental in the promulgation of presidential Executive Order 13112 on invasive species, and also serves on the IUCN Invasive Species Specialist Group and the IUCN Species Survival Commission. He has served on the Board of Governors of the Nature Conservancy, the federal Invasive Species Advisory Committee, and the editorial boards of Biodiversity and Conservation, Oecologia, Biological Invasions, BioScience and Ecology.

== Awards ==
- 1971: Mercer Award, Ecological Society of America
- 2006: Eminent Ecologist Award, Ecological Society of America
- 2000: Kempe Award for Distinguished Ecologists
- 2012: Ramon Margalef Prize in Ecology
- 2012: Elected to The National Academy of Sciences
- 2012: Elected Fellow of the Ecological Society of America

== Selected publications (chronological order) ==
- Simberloff, D. S., & Wilson, E. O. 1969. Experimental zoogeography of islands: the colonization of empty islands. Ecology, 50(2): 278-296. Experimental Zoogeography of Islands: The Colonization of Empty Islands
- Connor E.F. & Simberloff D. 1979. You can't falsify ecological hypotheses without data. Bull. Ecol. Soc. Amer. 60: 154-155.
- Rhymer J.M. & Simberloff D. 1996. Extinction by hybridization and introgression. Annu. Rev. Ecol. Syst. 27: 83-109.
- Simberloff D. 1996. Impacts of introduced species in the United States. Consequences 2.
- Simberloff D. & Stiling P. 1996. How risky is biological control? Ecology 77: 1965-1974.
- Simberloff, Daniel, Don C. Schmitz, and Tom C. Brown, eds. 1997. Strangers in Paradise: Impact and Management of Nonindigenous Species in Florida. Washington DC, Island Press.
- Simberloff D. & Stiling P. 1998. How risky is biological control? Reply. Ecology 79: 1834-1836.
- Parker I.M., Simberloff D., Lonsdale W.M., Goodell K., Wonham M., Kareiva P., Williamson M.H., von Holle B., Moyle P.B., Byers J.E. & Goldwasser L. 1999. Impact: toward a framework for understanding the ecological effects of invaders. Biol. Invasions 1: 3-19.
- Simberloff D. & Von Holle B. 1999. Positive interactions of nonindigenous species: Invasional meltdown? Biological Invasions 1, 21-32
- Mack R.N., Simberloff D., Lonsdale W.M., Evans H., Clout M. & Bazzaz F.A. 2000. Biotic invasions: causes, epidemiology, global consequences, and control. Ecol. Appl. 10: 689-710.
- Myers J.H., Simberloff D., Kuris A.M. & Carey J.R. 2000. Eradication revisited: dealing with exotic species. Trends Ecol. Evol. 15: 316-320.
- Myers J., Simberloff D., Kuris A. & Carey J. 2000. Eradication of exotic species - Reply. Trends Ecol. Evol. 15: 515-516.
- Ricciardi A., Steiner W.W.M., Mack R.N. & Simberloff D. 2000. Toward a global information system for invasive species. BioScience 50: 239-244.
- Simberloff D. 2000. Global climate change and introduced species in United States forests. The Science of the Total Environment 262: 253-261.
- Simberloff D. 2000. Foreword. p. vii-xiv in Elton C.S.(ed.) The ecology of invasions by animals and plants. University of Chicago Press, Chicago.
- Lockwood J.L., Simberloff D., McKinney M.L. & von Holle B. 2001. How many, and which, plants will invade natural areas? Biol. Invasions 3: 1-8.
- Simberloff D. 2001. Inadequate solutions for a global problem? Trends Ecol. Evol. 16: 323-324.
- Simberloff D. 2001. Eradication of island invasives: practical actions and results achieved. Trends Ecol. Evol. 16: 273-274.
- Thébaud C. & Simberloff D. 2001. Are plants really larger in their introduced ranges? The American Naturalist 157: 231-236.
- Rejmánek M., Richardson D.M., Barbour M.G., Crawley M.J., Hrusa G.F., Moyle P.B., Randall J.M., Simberloff D. & Williamson M. 2002. Biological invasions: politics and the discontinuity of ecological terminology. Bull. Ecol. Soc. Amer. 83: 131-133.
- Simberloff D. 2002. Managing existing populations of alien species. In: Alien Invaders in Canada’s Waters, Wetlands, and Forests (eds. R. Claudi, P. Nantel & E. Muckle-Jeffs). Natural Resources Canada, Canadian Forest Service, Ottawa
- Simberloff, D., Relva, M. A. & Nuñez, M. A. 2002. Gringos en el bosque: introduced tree invasion in a native Nothofagus/ Austrocedurs forest. Biological Invasions 4: 35-53
- Simberloff D. 2003. How much information on population biology is needed to manage introduced species? Conservation Biology 17, 83-92 JSTOR 420777
- Simberloff D. 2004. A rising tide of species and literature: a review of some recent books on biological invasions. BioScience 54: 247-254.
- Simberloff D. 2005. The politics of assessing risk for biological invasions: the USA as a case study. Trends in Ecology & Evolution 20: 216-222.
- Simberloff D., Parker I. M. & Windle P. N. (2005) Introduced species policy, management, and future research needs. Frontiers in Ecology and the Environment 3, 12-20
- Simberloff D. 2006. Invasional meltdown six years later: important phenomenon, unfortunate metaphor, or both? Ecol. Letters 9: 912-919.
- Vitule J.R.S., Freire C.A. & Simberloff D. 2009. Introduction of non-native freshwater fish can certainly be bad. Fish. Fisheries 10: 98-108.
- Roll U., Dayan T., Simberloff D. & Goren M. 2007. Characteristics of the introduced fish fauna of Israel. Biol. Invasions 9: 813-824.
- Simberloff D. & Rejmánek M. (eds.) 2011. Encyclopedia of Biological Invasions. University of California Press, Berkeley & Los Angeles. Encyclopedia of Biological Invasions
- Simberloff D. et al. 2013. Impacts of biological invasions: what's what and the way forward Trends in Ecology & Evolution 28: 58-66.
- Simberloff D. 2013. Biological invasions: Much progress plus several controversies. Contributions to Science 9: 7-16. Biological invasions: Much progress plus several controversies
