= Rio Preto da Eva =

Municipality of Amazonas, Brazil

- Municipality
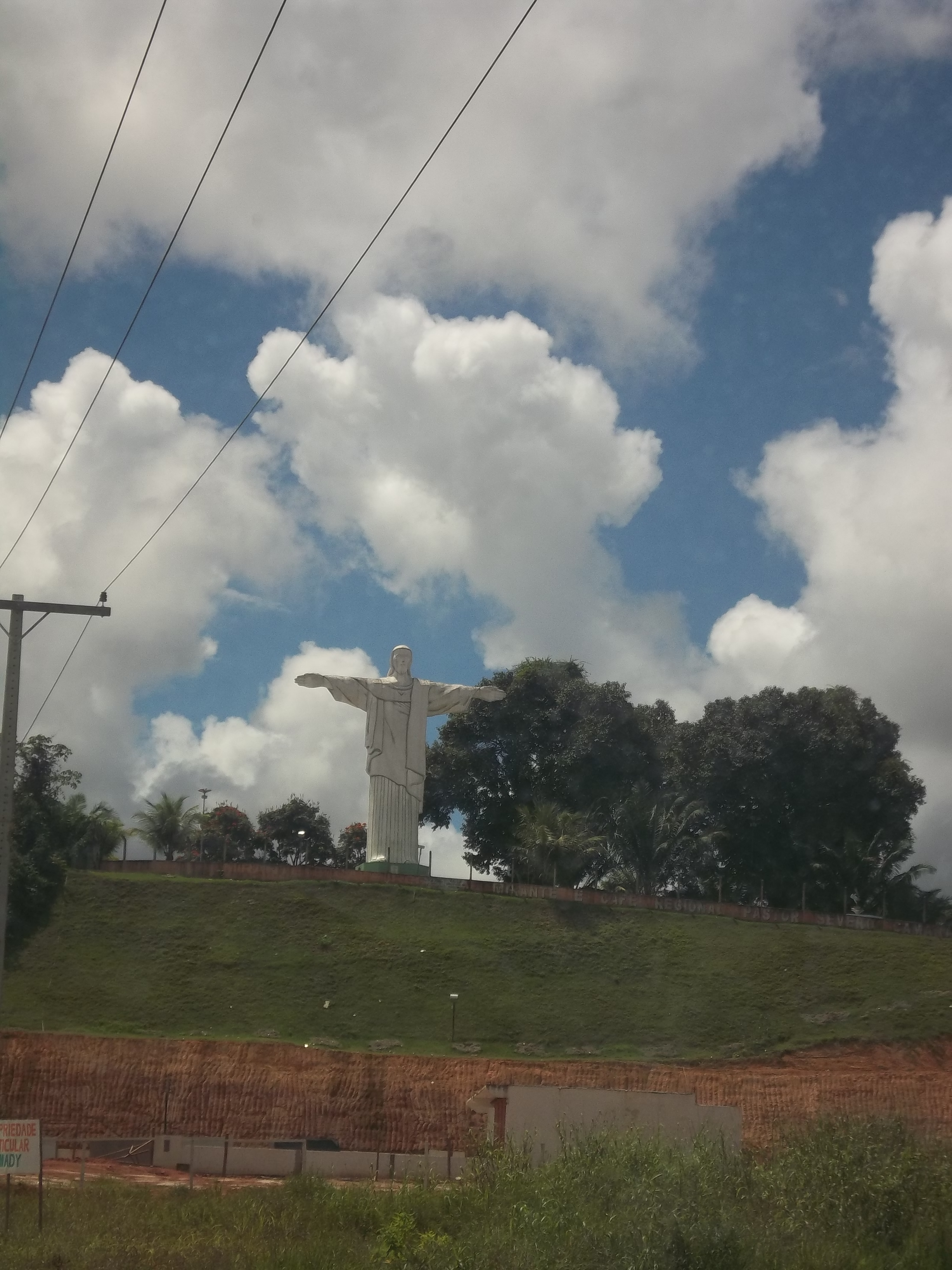

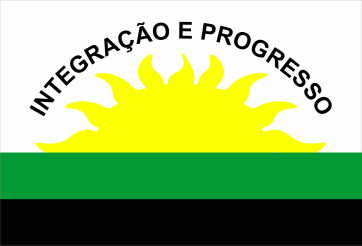
- Flag

- Location of the municipality inside Amazonas

- Location in Brazil
- Coordinates: 2°41′56″S 59°42′0″W
- Country: Brazil
- Region: North
- State: Amazonas

Population (2020)
  - Total: 34,106
- Time zone: UTC−4 (AMT)

Rio Preto da Eva (Black River of Eve in Portuguese) is a municipality located just east of Manaus in the Brazilian state of Amazonas. Its population was 34,106 (2020) and its area is 5,813 square kilometres (2,244 mi^{2}).

== Geography ==
The municipality contains most of the Biological Dynamics of Forest Fragments Project Area of Relevant Ecological Interest, created in 1985. The municipality contains the 27,342-hectare (67,560-acre) Rio Urubu State Forest, created in 2003.
