= Martin A. Nunez =

Argentine biologist

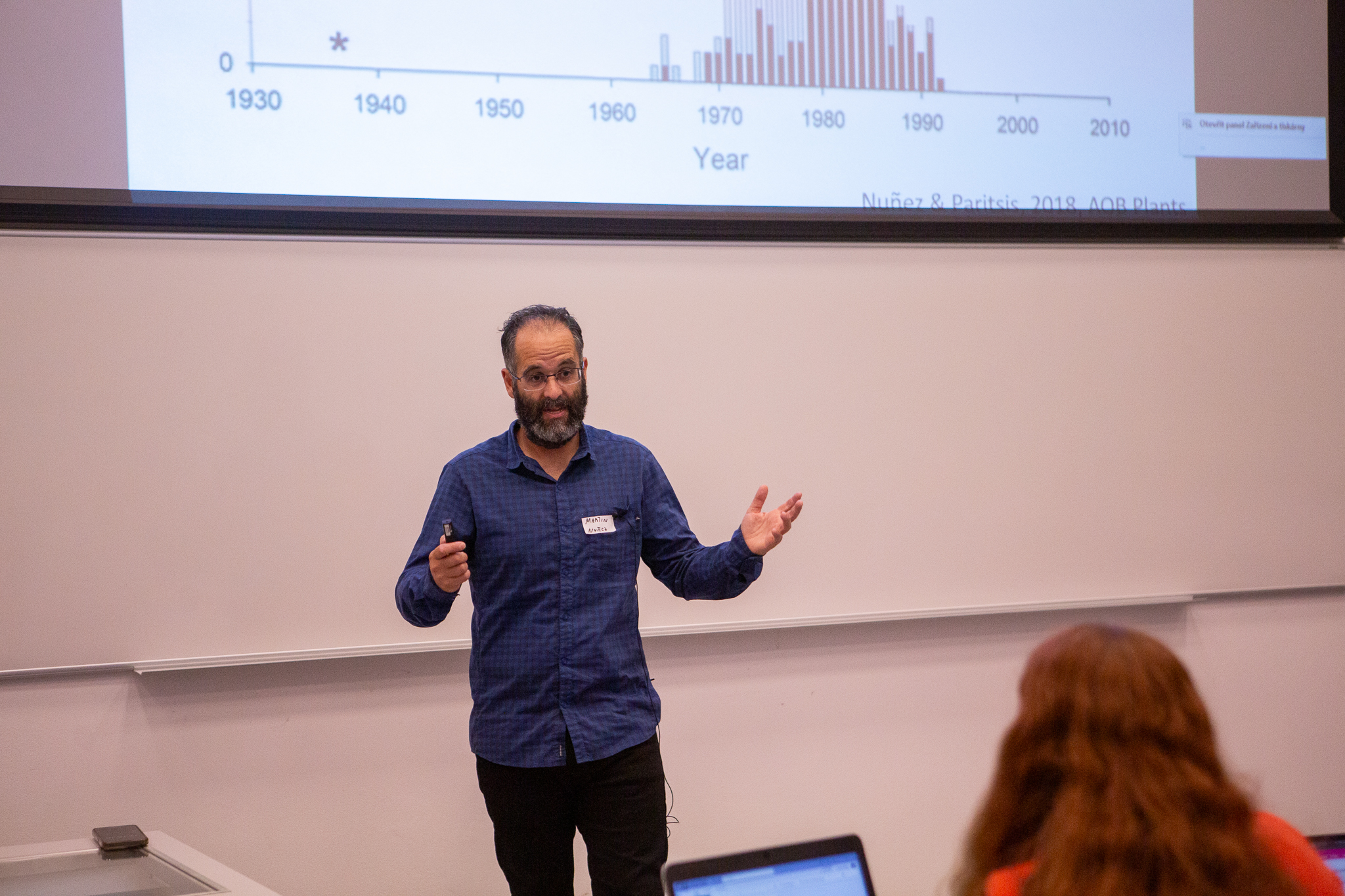
Dr. Martin A. Nunez giving a seminar on invasive species at the Czech University of Life Sciences in Prague

Martín Andrés Nuñez is an Argentine ecologist and academic specializing in biological invasions and plant-fungal interactions. He obtained several awards and he is currently a Professor in the Department of Biology and Biochemistry at the University of Houston, where he focuses on ecology, evolution, and the impacts of invasive species on ecosystems. He is now Editor-in-Chief of Academia Environmental Sciences and Sustainability, Senior Editor for the Journal of Applied Ecology, and he is also on the advisory board of Trends in Ecology and Evolution

== Early life and education ==
Nuñez earned his Ph.D. in Ecology and Evolutionary Biology from the University of Tennessee, Knoxville in 2008, under the supervision of noted ecologist Daniel Simberloff. He completed his undergraduate degree in Biological Sciences at Universidad Nacional del Comahue, Argentina in 2002.

== Academic career ==
Núñez has held various academic and research positions in Argentina and the United States, including professorships at Universidad Nacional del Comahue from 2013 and principal investigator roles at CONICET. He joined the University of Houston faculty in 2021.

He has a career as editor of scientific journals. He is now Editor-in-Chief of Academia Environmental Sciences and Sustainability, Senior Editor for the Journal of Applied Ecology, and Associate Editor for Biological Invasions. He is also on the advisory board of Trends in Ecology and Evolution. He has been on the board of Plant Ecology, Ecologia Austral and other journals.

== Research and publications ==
Núñez has published ca. 200 scientific articles in peer-reviewed journals, including Nature Ecology & Evolution, Trends in Ecology and Evolution, Biological Invasions, and Journal of Applied Ecology. His research examines invasive tree dynamics, mutualisms in invasion processes, and the global ecology of non-native species. He was a lead author on the Intergovernmental Science-Policy Platform on Biodiversity and Ecosystem Services (IPBES) Invasive Alien Species Assessment

He has found that that lack of mycorrhizal mutualists can halt their invasions. This is now an example found on textbooks, such as Ecology in Action (Cambridge University press). His research has also highlighted the challenges of using trees for carbon sequestration. He is also lately very active on the topic of geographical biases in where science is done, with the aim of helping make science more global

== Awards and honors ==
Nuñez has received awards for his contributions to invasion ecology, including recognition from the Ecological Society of America (ESA 2018 W.S. Cooper Award), The American Society of Ecological Restoration Annual Award (excellence in restoration research), the Lorenzo Parodi award in 2014 of the national academy of sciences of Argentina for best biologist under 40. He was also invited to contribute to high-level global assessments such as IPBES and has been highlighted in the “Best researcher” list and “leader in Ecology and Evolution” in research.com

== Books ==
In 2025, based on this editorial career, Nuñez published “A Pocket Guide to Scientific Writing and Publishing” with MNRD publishing, a resource for early-career researchers and scientists from the Global South (as him).

== Selected publications ==
- Nuñez, M. A., T. R. Horton, and D. Simberloff. 2009. Lack of belowground mutualisms hinders Pinaceae invasions. Ecology 90:2352–2359.
- Zenni, R. D., and M. A. Nuñez. 2013. The elephant in the room: The role of failed invasions in understanding invasion biology. Oikos 122:801–815.
- Kuebbing, S. E., and M. A. Nuñez. 2016. Invasive non-native plants have a greater effect on neighbouring natives than other non-natives. Nature Plants 2.
- Nuñez, M. A., M. C. Chiuffo, A. Torres, T. Paul, R. D. Dimarco, P. Raal, N. Policelli, J. Moyano, R. A. García, B. W. van Wilgen, A. Pauchard, and D. M. Richardson. 2017. Ecology and management of invasive Pinaceae around the world: progress and challenges. Biological Invasions 19:3099–3120.
- Nuñez, M. A., and T. Amano. 2021. Monolingual searches can limit and bias results in global literature reviews. Nature Ecology and Evolution 5:264.
- Nuñez, M. A., M. C. Chiuffo, A. Pauchard, and R. D. Zenni. 2021. Making ecology really global. Trends in Ecology and Evolution 36:766–769.
- Nuñez, M. A., T. August, S. Bacher, B. S. Galil, P. E. Hulme, T. Ikeda, M. A. McGeoch, A. Ordonez, S. Rahlao, T. R. Truong, A. Pauchard, H. E. Roy, K. V. Sankaran, E. Schwindt, H. Seebens, A. W. Sheppard, P. Stoett, V. Vandvik, and L. A. Meyerson. 2024. Including a diverse set of voices to address biological invasions. Trends in Ecology and Evolution 39:409–412.
- Lembrechts, J. J., A. Pauchard, J. Lenoir, M. A. Nuñez, C. Geron, A. Ven, P. Bravo-Monasterio, E. Teneb, I. Nijs, and A. Milbau. 2016. Disturbance is the key to plant invasions in cold environments. Proceedings of the National Academy of Sciences of the United States of America 113:14061-14066. (Ecological Society of America 2018 W.S. Cooper Award)
- Torres, A., T. Morán-López, M. A. Rodriguez-Cabal, and M. A. Núñez. 2024. Inverse priority effects: The order and timing of removal of invasive species influence community reassembly. Journal of Applied Ecology 61:51–62. (British ecological Society 2025 Southwood Prize)
- Policelli, N., T. D. Bruns, R. Vilgalys, and M. A. Nuñez. 2019. Suilloid fungi as global drivers of pine invasions. New Phytologist 222:714–725.
- Moyano, J., R. D. Dimarco, J. Paritsis, T. Peterson, D. A. Peltzer, K. M. Crawford, M. A. McCary, K. T. Davis, A. Pauchard, and M. A. Nuñez. 2024. Unintended consequences of planting native and non-native trees in treeless ecosystems to mitigate climate change. Journal of Ecology 112:2480–2491.
