= Thomas Lovejoy =

American ecologist (1941–2021)

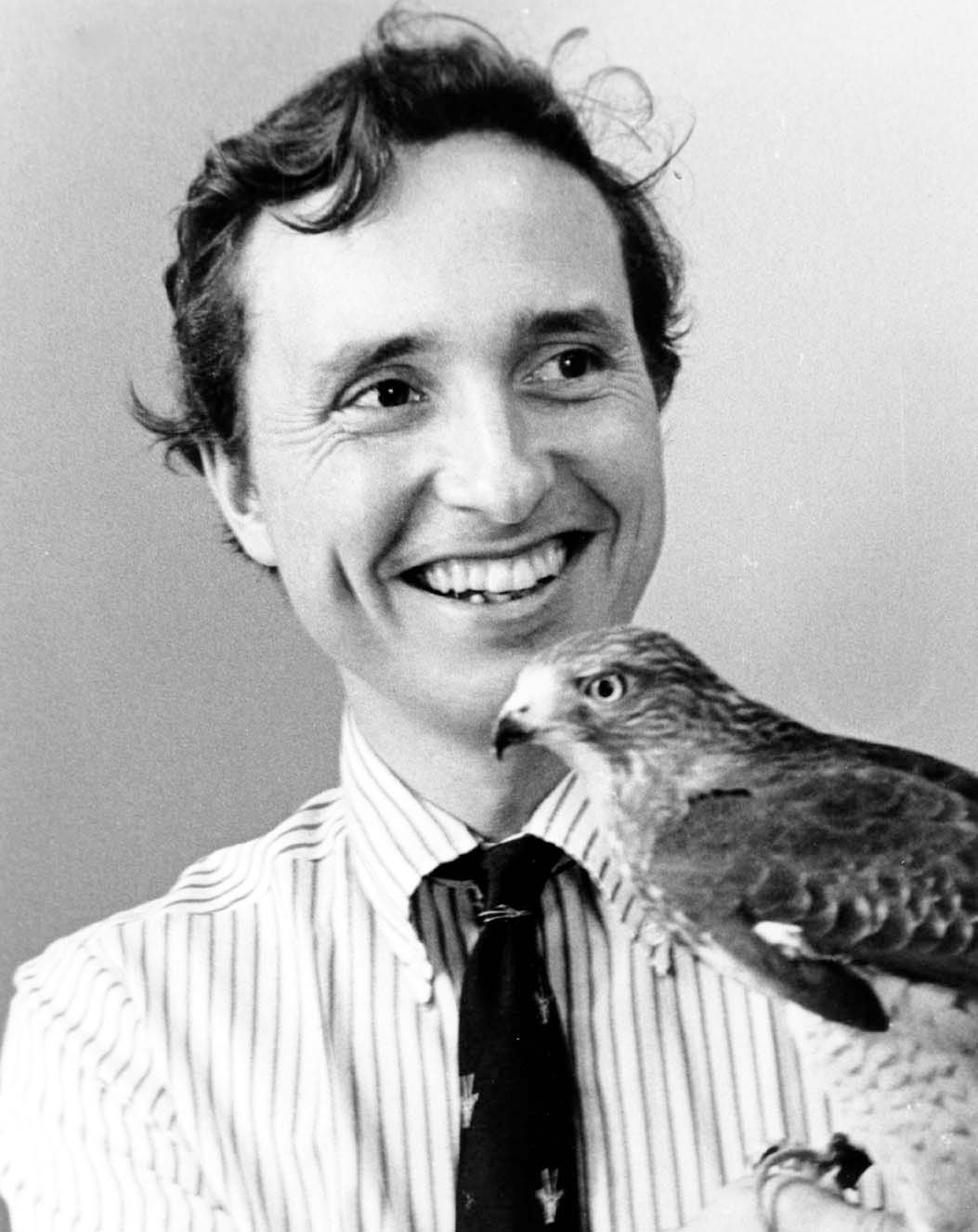
- Lovejoy in 1974
- Born: Thomas Eugene Lovejoy III; August 22, 1941; Manhattan, New York, U.S.
- Died: December 25, 2021 (aged 80); McLean, Virginia, U.S.
- Awards: Tyler Prize for Environmental Achievement (2001), BBVA Foundation Frontiers of Knowledge Award (2008), Blue Planet Prize (2012)
- Scientific career
- Fields: Conservation Biology
- Institutions: Amazon Biodiversity Center, George Mason University, World Bank, Heinz Center for Science Economics and the Environment, United Nations Foundation

Thomas Eugene Lovejoy III (August 22, 1941 – December 25, 2021) was an American ecologist who was President of the Amazon Biodiversity Center, a Senior Fellow at the United Nations Foundation and a university professor in the Environmental Science and Policy department at George Mason University. Lovejoy was the World Bank's chief biodiversity advisor and the lead specialist for environment for Latin America and the Caribbean as well as senior advisor to the president of the United Nations Foundation. In 2008, he also was the first Biodiversity Chair of the H. John Heinz III Center for Science, Economics and the Environment to 2013. Previously he served as president of the Heinz Center since May 2002. Lovejoy introduced the term biological diversity to the scientific community in 1980. He was a past chair of the Scientific Technical Advisory Panel (STAP) for the Global Environment Facility (GEF), the multibillion-dollar funding mechanism for developing countries in support of their obligations under international environmental conventions.

== Biography ==
=== Early life ===
Thomas Eugene Lovejoy III was born on August 22, 1941, in Manhattan, New York, to Jeanne (Gillette) and Thomas Eugene Lovejoy, Jr. He attended Millbrook School, where he worked at The Trevor Zoo, under zoo founder Frank Trevor and his wife Janet. "The first three weeks were the key, and that's what flipped my switch in life and Biology. I was not prepared for the impact the Trevors would actually have on me in the classroom. And it was like my first three weeks and that was it. I'm going to be a biologist." He graduated from Millbrook in 1959.

=== Education ===
Lovejoy enrolled at Yale University, earning his bachelor's degree in biology in 1964 while working as a zoological assistant at the Yale Peabody Museum of Natural History. He also received his Ph.D. in biology from Yale University.

=== Conservation work ===
As a tropical biologist and conservation biologist, Lovejoy worked in the Amazon rainforest of Brazil beginning in 1965.

From 1973 to 1987, Lovejoy directed the conservation program at the World Wildlife Fund-U.S. From 1987 to 1998 he served as assistant secretary for environmental and external affairs for the Smithsonian Institution in Washington, D.C., and in 1994 became counselor to the secretary for biodiversity and environmental affairs.

From 1999 to 2002, Lovejoy served as chief biodiversity adviser to the president of the World Bank. In 2010 and 2011, he served as chair of the Independent Advisory Group on Sustainability for the Inter-American Development Bank. He was senior adviser to the president of the United Nations Foundation, chair of the Yale Institute for Biospheric Studies, and was past president of the American Institute of Biological Sciences, past chairman of the United States Man and Biosphere Program, and past president of the Society for Conservation Biology.

Lovejoy developed the debt-for-nature swaps, in which environmental groups purchase shaky foreign debt on the secondary market at the market rate, which is considerably discounted, and then convert this debt at its face value into the local currency to purchase biologically sensitive tracts of land in the debtor nation for purposes of environmental protection.

Critics of the 'debt-for-nature' schemes, such as National Center for Public Policy Research, which distributes a wide variety of materials consistently justifying corporate freedom and environmental deregulation, aver that plans deprive developing nations of the extractable raw resources that are currently essential to further economic development. Economic stagnation and local resentment of "Yankee imperialism" can result, they warn. In reality, no debt-for-nature swap occurs without the approval of the country in question.

Lovejoy also supported the Forests Now Declaration, which calls for new market-based mechanisms to protect tropical forests.

Lovejoy played a central role in the establishment of conservation biology, by initiating the idea and planning with B. A. Wilcox in June 1978 for The First International Conference on Research in Conservation Biology, that was held in La Jolla, in September 1978. The proceedings, introduced conservation biology to the scientific community.

Lovejoy founded the Biological Dynamics of Forest Fragments Project (BDFFP) near Manaus, Brazil, in 1979 to understand the effects of the fragmentation on tropical rainforests on ecosystems and wildlife.

Lovejoy served on many scientific and conservation boards and advisory groups, and was the author of numerous articles and books. He is often misattributed as the founder of the PBS television series NATURE, for which he served as an advisor in the early days. He served in an official capacity in the Reagan, George H. W. Bush, and Clinton administrations.

Lovejoy predicted in 1980 (see quote below), that 10–20 percent of all species on earth would have gone extinct by the year 2020.

=== Awards and recognitions ===
In 1996, Lovejoy was elected to the American Academy of Arts and Sciences.

Lovejoy was elected to the American Philosophical Society in 1999.

In 2001, Lovejoy was the recipient of the University of Southern California's Tyler Prize for Environmental Achievement. Lovejoy has been granted the 2008 BBVA Foundation Frontiers of Knowledge Award in the Ecology and Conservation Biology category (ex aequo with William F. Laurance).

In 2001, Lovejoy received the Golden Plate Award of the American Academy of Achievement presented by Awards Council member Peter H. Raven.

In 2004, a new wasp species that acts as a parasite on butterfly larvae was discovered on the Pacific slope of the Talamanca mountain range in Costa Rica by Ronald Zúñiga, a specialist in bees, wasps and ants at the National Biodiversity Institute (INBio). INBio named the species Polycyrtus lovejoyi in honor of Lovejoy for his contributions in the world of biodiversity and support for INBio.

On October 31, 2012, Lovejoy was awarded the Blue Planet Prize for being "the first scientist to academically clarify how humans are causing habitat fragmentation and pushing biological diversity towards crisis."

Lovejoy served continuously on the board of directors, from 2000, of the Amazon Conservation Team, which works in partnership with indigenous people of tropical South America in conserving the biodiversity of the Amazon rainforest, as well as the culture and land of its indigenous people. He served on the board of directors from 2009 for the Amazon Conservation Association, whose mission is to conserve the biological diversity of the Amazon. He was also an emeritus member of the board of directors for Population Action International and served on the Scientific Board of SavingSpecies (elevated to SavingNature in 2019), a conservation organization featured in a Nature magazine article about Thomas Lovejoy's scientific accomplishments.

In 2016, he was selected as a U.S. Science Envoy by the United States State Department.

In 2018, Lovejoy co-founded the Amazon Biodiversity Center to support the work of the Biological Dynamics of Forest Fragments Project. He was elected Fellow of Ecological Society of America in 2019.

In 2021, he was elected member of the U. S. National Academy of Sciences.

He died from pancreatic neuroendocrine tumor on December 25, 2021, in McLean, Virginia, at the age of 80.
