= Patch dynamics =

Ecology

Patch dynamics is an ecological perspective that the structure, function, and dynamics of ecological systems can be understood through studying their interactive patches. Patch dynamics, as a term, may also refer to the spatiotemporal changes within and among patches that make up a landscape. Patch dynamics is ubiquitous in terrestrial and aquatic systems across organizational levels and spatial scales. From a patch dynamics perspective, populations, communities, ecosystems, and landscapes may all be studied effectively as mosaics of patches that differ in size, shape, composition, history, and boundary characteristics.

The idea of patch dynamics dates back to the 1940s when plant ecologists studied the structure and dynamics of vegetation in terms of the interactive patches that it comprises. A mathematical theory of patch dynamics was developed by Simon Levin and Robert Paine in the 1970s, originally to describe the pattern and dynamics of an intertidal community as a patch mosaic created and maintained by tidal disturbances. Patch dynamics became a dominant theme in ecology between the late 1970s and the 1990s.

Patch dynamics is a conceptual approach to ecosystem and habitat analysis that emphasizes dynamics of heterogeneity within a system (i.e. that each area of an ecosystem is made up of a mosaic of small 'sub-ecosystems').

Diverse patches of habitat created by natural disturbance regimes are seen as critical to the maintenance of this diversity (ecology). A habitat patch is any discrete area with a definite shape, spatial and configuration used by a species for breeding or obtaining other resources. Mosaics are the patterns within landscapes that are composed of smaller elements, such as individual forest stands, shrubland patches, highways, farms, or towns.

== Patches and mosaics ==
Historically, due to the short time scale of human observation, mosaic landscapes were perceived to be static patterns of human population mosaics. This focus centered on the idea that the status of a particular population, community, or ecosystem could be understood by studying a particular patch within a mosaic. However, this perception ignored the conditions that interact with, and connect patches. In 1979, Bormann and Likens coined the phrase shifting mosaic to describe the theory that landscapes change and fluctuate, and are in fact dynamic. This is related to the battle of cells that occurs in a Petri dish.

Patch dynamics refers to the concept that landscapes are dynamic. There are three states that a patch can exist in: potential, active, and degraded. Patches in the potential state are transformed into active patches through colonization of the patch by dispersing species arriving from other active or degrading patches. Patches are transformed from the active state to the degraded state when the patch is abandoned, and patches change from degraded to active through a process of recovery.

Logging, fire, farming, and reforestation can all contribute to the process of colonization, and can effectively change the shape of the patch. Patch dynamics also refers to changes in the structure, function, and composition of individual patches that can, for example, affect the rate of nutrient cycling.

Patches are also linked. Although patches may be separated in space, migration can occur from one patch to another. This migration maintains the population of some patches, and can be the mechanism by which some plant species spread. This implies that ecological systems within landscapes are open, rather than closed and isolated.

== Conservation efforts ==
Recognizing the patch dynamics within a system is needed for conservation efforts to succeed. Successful conservation includes understanding how a patch changes and predicting how they will be affected by external forces. These externalities include natural effects, such as land use, disturbance, restoration, and succession, and the effects of human activities. In a sense, conservation is the active maintenance of patch dynamics. The analysis of patch dynamics could be used to predict changes in biodiversity of an ecosystem. When patches of species can be tracked, it has been shown that fluctuations on the biggest patch (the most dominant species) can be used as an early warning of a biodiversity collapse. That means that if external conditions, like climate change and habitat fragmentation, change the internal dynamics of patches, a sharp reduction in biodiversity can be detected before it is produced.

== See also ==
- Conservation biology – Study of threats to biological diversity
- Edge effect – Ecological concept
- Forest dynamics – Biotic and abiotic ecosystem influences
- Habitat conservation – Management practice for protecting types of environments
- Habitat corridor – Connecting wild territories for animals
- Habitat fragmentation – Discontinuities in an organism's environment causing population fragmentation
- Island biogeography – Study of the ecology of isolated habitats
- Landscape ecology – Relationships between ecological processes in the environment and particular ecosystems
- Spatial ecology – Study of the distribution or space occupied by species
