= Insular biogeography =

Study of the ecology of isolated habitats

Insular biogeography or island biogeography is a field within biogeography that examines the factors that affect the species richness and diversification of isolated natural communities. The theory was originally developed to explain the pattern of the species–area relationship occurring in oceanic islands. Under either name it is now used in reference to any ecosystem (present or past) that is isolated due to being surrounded by unlike ecosystems, and has been extended to mountain peaks, seamounts, oases, fragmented forests, and even natural habitats isolated by human land development. The field was started in the 1960s by the ecologists Robert H. MacArthur and E. O. Wilson, who coined the term island biogeography in their inaugural contribution to Princeton's Monograph in Population Biology series, which attempted to predict the number of species that would exist on a newly created island.

== Definitions ==
For biogeographical purposes, an insular environment or "island" is any area of habitat suitable for a specific ecosystem, surrounded by an expanse of unsuitable habitat. While this may be a traditional island—a mass of land surrounded by water—the term may also be applied to many nontraditional "islands", such as the peaks of mountains, isolated springs or lakes, and non-contiguous woodlands. The concept is often applied to natural habitats surrounded by human-altered landscapes, such as expanses of grassland surrounded by highways or housing tracts, and national parks. Additionally, what is an insular for one organism may not be so for others, some organisms located on mountaintops may also be found in the valleys, while others may be restricted to the peaks.

== Theory ==
The theory of insular biogeography proposes that the number of species found in an undisturbed insular environment ("island") is determined by immigration and extinction. And further, that the isolated populations may follow different evolutionary routes, as shown by Darwin's observation of finches in the Galapagos Islands. Immigration and emigration are affected by the distance of an island from a source of colonists (distance effect). Usually this source is the mainland, but it can also be other islands. Islands that are more isolated are less likely to receive immigrants than islands that are less isolated.

This diagram shows the influence that the size of an island and its distance from the mainland has on the amount of immigration and species richness of the island. It can be seen that a larger island close to the mainland has the most species richness and a smaller one far from the mainland has the least.

The rate of extinction once a species manages to colonize an island is affected by island size; this is the species-area curve or effect. Larger islands contain larger habitat areas and opportunities for more different varieties of habitat. Larger habitat size reduces the probability of extinction due to chance events. Habitat heterogeneity increases the number of species that will be successful after immigration.

Over time, the countervailing forces of extinction and immigration result in an equilibrium level of species richness.

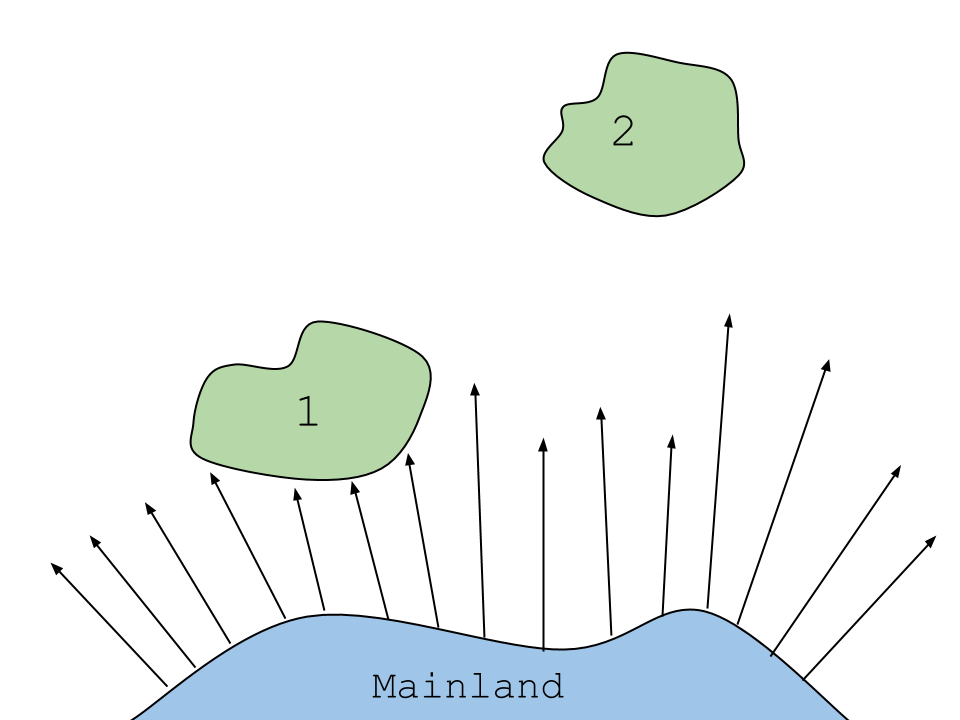
This diagram shows the effect of an island's distance from the mainland on the amount of species richness. The sizes of the two islands are approximately the same. Island 1 receives more random dispersion of organisms, while island number two, since it is farther away, receives less random dispersion of organisms.

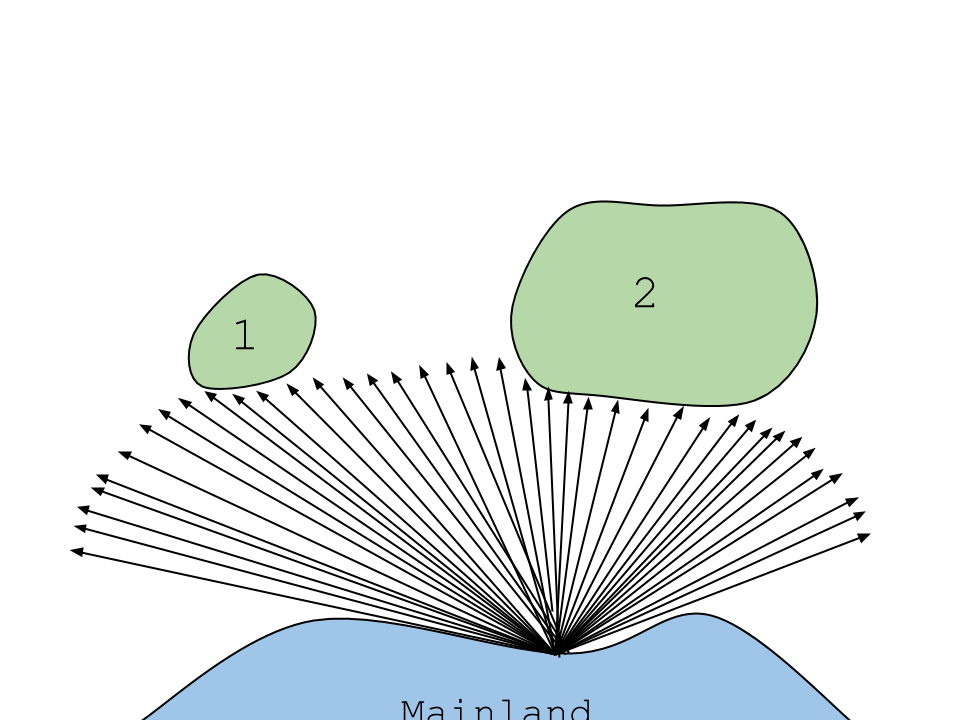
This diagram shows the effect of an island's size on the amount of species richness. The diagram shows two islands equidistant from the mainland. Island 1 receives less random dispersion of organisms. While island 2 receives more of the arrows and therefore more random dispersion of organisms.

=== Modifications ===
In addition to having an effect on immigration rates, isolation can also affect extinction rates. Populations on islands that are less isolated are less likely to go extinct because individuals from the source population and other islands can immigrate and "rescue" the population from extinction; this is known as the rescue effect.

In addition to having an effect on extinction, island size can also affect immigration rates. Species may actively target larger islands for their greater number of resources and available niches; or, larger islands may accumulate more species by chance just because they are larger. This is the target effect.

=== Influencing factors ===
Total number of reptilian and amphibian species on seven small and large islands in the West Indies

- Degree of isolation (distance to nearest neighbour, and mainland)
- Length of isolation (time)
- Size of island (larger area usually facilitates greater diversity)
- The habitat suitability which includes:
  - Climate (tropical versus arctic, humid versus arid, variability, etc.)
  - Initial plant and animal composition if previously attached to a larger land mass (e.g. marsupials, primates)
  - The current species composition
- Location relative to ocean currents (influences nutrient, fish, bird, and seed flow patterns)
- Location relative to dust blow (influences nutrients)
- Serendipity (the impacts of chance arrivals)
- Human activity

== Species-area relationships ==
Species–area relationships show the relationship between a given area and the species richness within that area. This concept comes from the theory of island biogeography, and is well illustrated on islands because they are relatively isolated. Thus, the immigrating species and the species going extinct from an island are more limited and therefore easier to keep track of. It is expected that as the area and species richness relationship are directly proportional to one another. For example, as the area of a series of islands increase, there is a direct relationship to the increasing species richness of primary producers. It is important to consider that island species area relationships will behave somewhat differently than mainland species area relationships, however the connections between the two can still prove to be useful.

The species-area relationship equation is: $S= cA^z$.

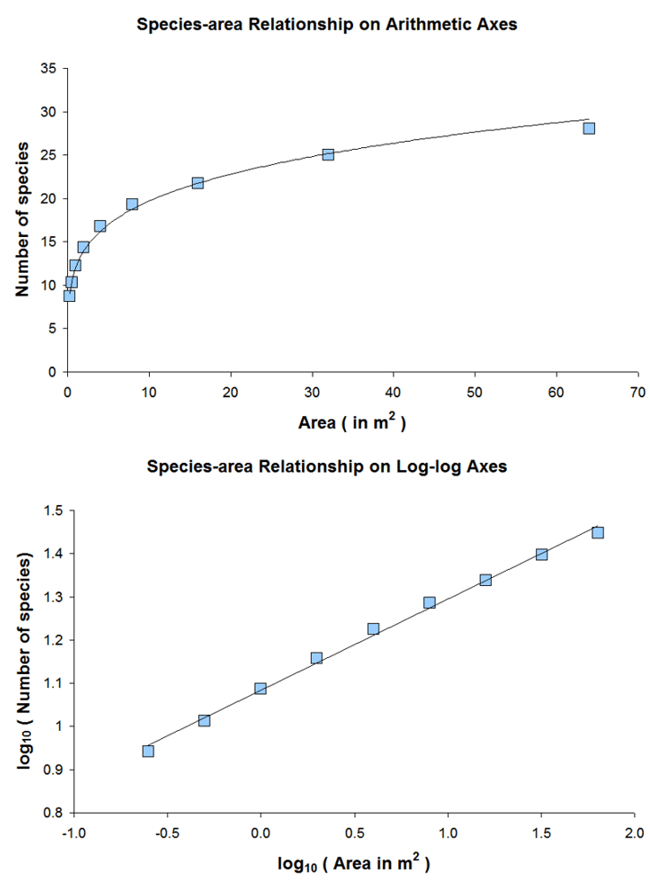
An example of what a species-area relationship may look like when graphed.

In this equation, $S$ represents the measure of diversity of a species (for example, the number of species) and $c$ is a constant representing the y-intercept. $A$ represents the area of the island or space that is being examined and $z$ represents the slope of the area curve.

This function can also be expressed as a logarithmic function: $log(S)=log(c)+zlog(A)$ This expression of the function allows for the function to be drawn as a linear function. However, the core meaning of the function is the same: the area of the island dictates the species area relationship.

== Historical record ==
The theory can be studied through the fossils, which provide a record of life on Earth. 300 million years ago, Europe and North America lay on the equator and were covered by steamy tropical rainforests. Climate change devastated these tropical rainforests during the Carboniferous Period and as the climate grew drier, rainforests fragmented. Shrunken islands of forest were uninhabitable for amphibians but were well suited to reptiles, which became more diverse and even varied their diet in the rapidly changing environment; this Carboniferous rainforest collapse event triggered an evolutionary burst among reptiles.

== Research experiments ==
The theory of island biogeography was experimentally tested by E. O. Wilson and his student Daniel Simberloff in the mangrove islands in the Florida Keys. Species richness on several small mangroves islands were surveyed. The islands were fumigated with methyl bromide to clear their arthropod communities. Following fumigation, the immigration of species onto the islands was monitored. Within a year the islands had been recolonized to pre-fumigation levels. However, Simberloff and Wilson contended this final species richness was oscillating in quasi-equilibrium. Islands closer to the mainland recovered faster as predicted by the Theory of Island Biogeography. The effect of island size was not tested, since all islands were of approximately equal size.

Research conducted at the rainforest research station on Barro Colorado Island has yielded a large number of publications concerning the ecological changes following the formation of islands, such as the local extinction of large predators and the subsequent changes in prey populations.

== Applications to Island Like Systems (ILS) ==
The theory of island biogeography was originally used to study oceanic islands, but those concepts can be extrapolated to other areas of study. Island species dynamics give information about how species move and interact within Island Like Systems (ILS). Rather than an actual island, ILS are primarily defined by their isolation within an ecosystem. In the case of an island, the area referred to as the matrix is usually the body of water surrounding it. The mainland is often the nearest non-island piece of land. Similarly, in an ILS the "mainland" is the source of immigrating species, however the matrix is far more varied. By imagining how different types of isolated ecosystems, for example a pond that is surrounded by land, are similar to an island ecosystems it can be understood how theories and phenomena that are true of island ecosystems can be applied to ILS. However, the overall immigration and extinction patterns that are outlined in the theory of island biogeography as they play out on islands, also play out between ecosystems on the mainland.

The concepts of area of an island and the level of isolation from a mainland as presented in the theory of island biogeography, apply to ILS. The main difference is in the dynamics of area and isolation. For example, an ILS may have a changing area because of seasons, which may impact its degree of isolation. Resource availability plays an important role in the conditions that an island is under. This is another factor that changes in ILS in comparison to real islands, since generally there is a greater resource availability in some ILS than true islands.

Species-area relationships, as described above, can be applied to Island Like Systems (ILS) as well. It is typically observed that as the area of an ecosystem increases, the species richness is directly proportional. One major difference is that $z$-values are generally lower for ILSs than true islands. Furthermore, $c$ values also vary between true islands and ILS, and within types of ILS.

== Applications in conservation biology ==
Within a few years of the publishing of the theory, its potential application to the field of conservation biology had been realised and was being vigorously debated in ecological circles. The idea that reserves and national parks formed islands inside human-altered landscapes (habitat fragmentation), and that these reserves could lose species as they 'relaxed towards equilibrium' (that is they would lose species as they achieved their new equilibrium number, known as ecosystem decay) caused a great deal of concern. This is particularly true when conserving larger species which tend to have larger ranges. A study by William Newmark, published in the journal Nature and reported in The New York Times, showed a strong correlation between the size of a protected U.S. National Park and the number of species of mammals.

This led to the debate known as single large or several small (SLOSS), described by writer David Quammen in The Song of the Dodo as "ecology's own genteel version of trench warfare". In the years after the publication of Wilson and Simberloff's papers ecologists had found more examples of the species-area relationship, and conservation planning was taking the view that the one large reserve could hold more species than several smaller reserves, and that larger reserves should be the norm in reserve design. This view was in particular championed by Jared Diamond. This led to concern by other ecologists, including Dan Simberloff, who considered this to be an unproven over-simplification that would damage conservation efforts. Habitat diversity was as or more important than size in determining the number of species protected.

Island biogeography theory also led to the development of wildlife corridors as a conservation tool to increase connectivity between habitat islands. Wildlife corridors can increase the movement of species between parks and reserves and therefore increase the number of species that can be supported, but they can also allow for the spread of disease and pathogens between populations, complicating the simple proscription of connectivity being good for biodiversity.

In species diversity, island biogeography most describes allopatric speciation. Allopatric speciation is where new gene pools arise out of natural selection in isolated gene pools. Island biogeography is also useful in considering sympatric speciation, the idea of different species arising from one ancestral species in the same area. Interbreeding between the two differently adapted species would prevent speciation, but in some species, sympatric speciation appears to have occurred. Island ecosystems are typically shaped by a set of ecological limitations—such as lower environmental heterogeneity, restricted availability of resources, and a lack (or very low abundance) of predators or competing species. These conditions can drive phenotypic shifts in insular populations, arising as adaptive responses to environmental pressures that differ from those experienced within the species' original realised niche.

== See also ==
- Disturbance (ecology)
- Island ecology
- Mammals of the Caribbean
- Patch dynamics
- Distance decay
- Sky island
