= Habitat fragmentation =

Discontinuities in an organism's environment causing population fragmentation

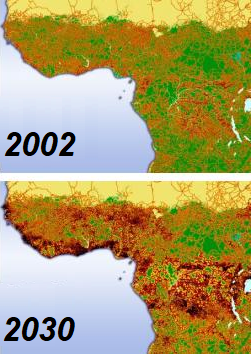
Predicted fragmentation and destruction of Great Ape habitat in Central Africa, from the GLOBIO and GRASP projects in 2002. Areas shown in black and red delineate areas of severe and moderate habitat loss, respectively.

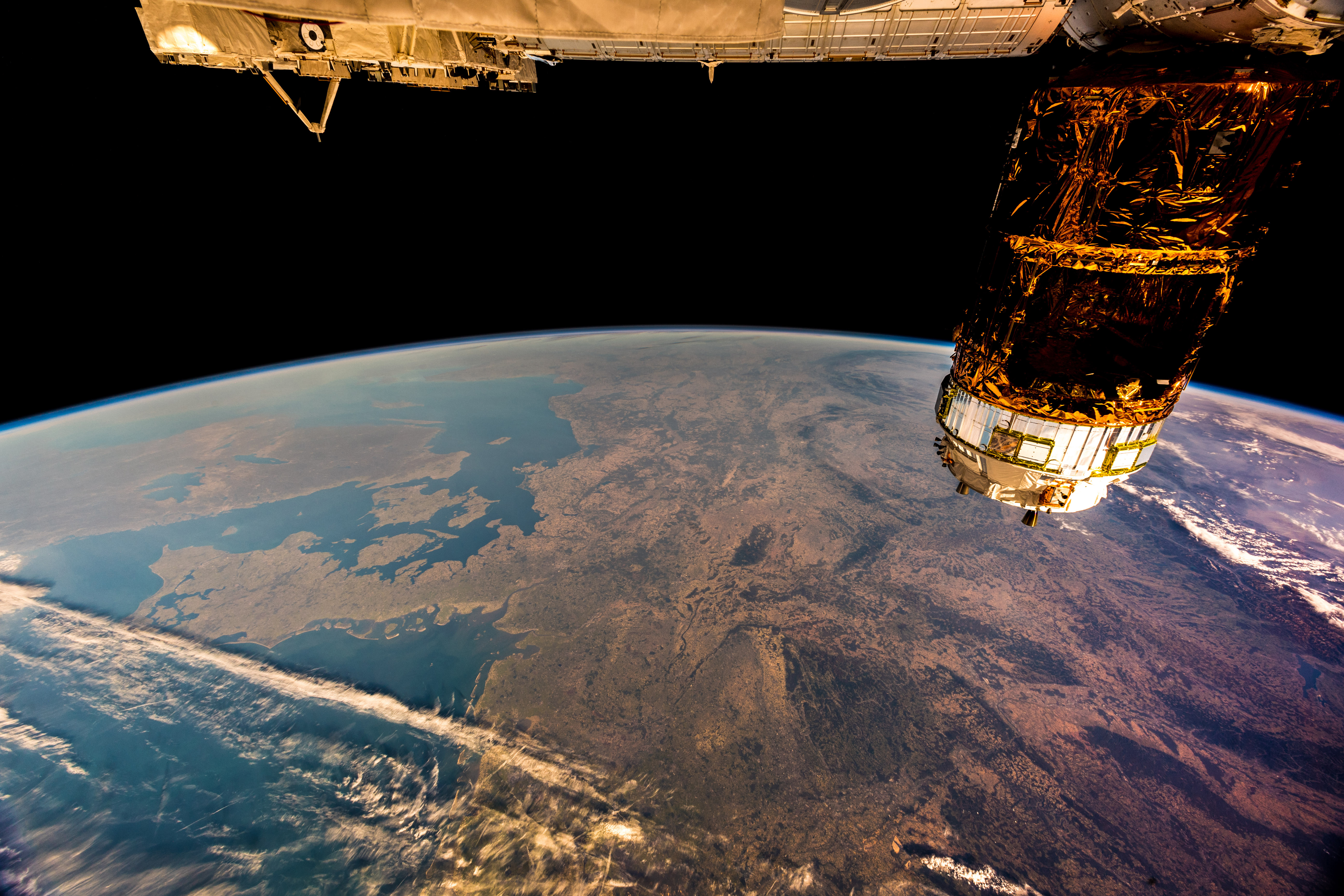
Deforestation in Europe. France is the most deforested country in Europe, with only 15% of the native vegetation remaining.

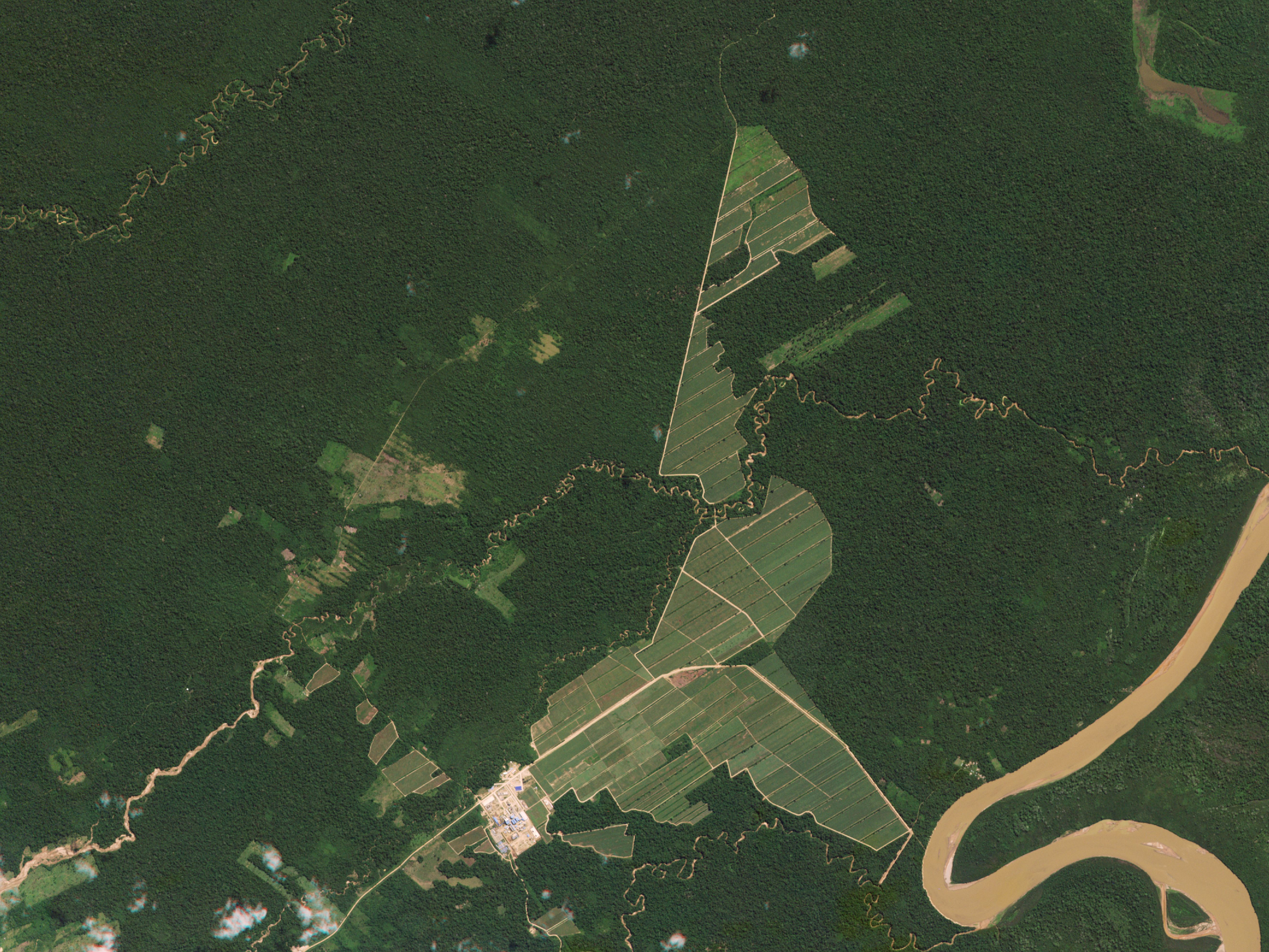
Deforestation in Bolivia, 2016.

Habitat fragmentation is the emergence of discontinuities (fragmentation) in an organism's preferred environment (habitat), causing population fragmentation and ecosystem decay. Causes of habitat fragmentation include geological processes that slowly alter the layout of the physical environment (suspected of being one of the major causes of speciation), and human activity such as land conversion, which can alter the environment much faster and causes the population fluctuation of many species. More specifically, habitat fragmentation is a process by which large and contiguous habitats get divided into smaller, isolated patches of habitats.

== Definition ==
The term habitat fragmentation includes five discrete phenomena:

- Reduction in the total area of the habitat
- Decrease of the interior: edge ratio
- Isolation of one habitat fragment from other areas of habitat
- Breaking up of one patch of habitat into several smaller patches
- Decrease in the average size of each patch of habitat

"fragmentation ... not only causes loss of the amount of habitat but by creating small, isolated patches it also changes the properties of the remaining habitat" (van den Berg et al. 2001). Habitat fragmentation is the landscape level of the phenomenon, and patch level process. Thus meaning, it covers; the patch areas, edge effects, and patch shape complexity.

In scientific literature, there is some debate whether the term "habitat fragmentation" applies in cases of habitat loss, or whether the term primarily applies to the phenomenon of habitat being cut into smaller pieces without significant reduction in habitat area. Scientists who use the stricter definition of "habitat fragmentation" per se would refer to the loss of habitat area as "habitat loss" and explicitly mention both terms if describing a situation where the habitat becomes less connected and there is less overall habitat.

Furthermore, habitat fragmentation is considered as an invasive threat to biodiversity, due to its implications of affecting large number of species than biological invasions, overexploitation, or pollution.

Additionally, the effects of habitat fragmentation damage the ability for species, such as native plants, to be able to effectively adapt to their changing environments. Ultimately, this prevents gene flow from one generation of population to the next, especially for species living in smaller population sizes. Whereas, for species of larger populations have more genetic mutations which can arise and genetic recombination impacts which can increase species survival in those environments. Overall, habitat fragmentation results in habitat disintegration and habitat loss which both tie into destructing biodiversity as a whole.

== Causes ==
=== Natural causes ===
Evidence of habitat destruction through natural processes such as volcanism, fire, and climate change is found in the fossil record. Studies have demonstrated the impacts of individual species at the landscape level For example, From research the results show that the impact of deer herbivory on forest plant communities can be observed at the landscape level at the Rondeau Provincial park for the period of 1955-1978 and also habitat fragmentation of tropical rainforests in Euramerica 300 million years ago led to a great loss of amphibian diversity, but simultaneously the drier climate spurred on a burst of diversity among reptiles.

=== Human causes ===
Habitat fragmentation is frequently caused by humans when native plants are cleared for human activities such as agriculture, rural development, urbanization and the creation of hydroelectric reservoirs. Habitats which were once continuous become divided into separate fragments. Due to human activities, many tropical and temperate habitats have already been severely fragmented, and in the near future, the degree of fragmentation will significantly rise. After intensive clearing, the separate fragments tend to be very small islands isolated from each other by cropland, pasture, pavement, or even barren land. The latter is often the result of slash and burn farming in tropical forests. In the wheat belt of central-western New South Wales, Australia, 90% of the native vegetation has been cleared and over 99% of the tall grass prairie of North America has been cleared, resulting in extreme habitat fragmentation.

=== Endogenous vs. exogenous ===
The two types of processes that can lead to habitat fragmentation are known as endogenous processes and exogenous processes. Endogenous is a process that develops as a part of species biology so they typically include changes in biology, behavior, and interactions within or between species. Endogenous threats can result in changes to breeding patterns or migration patterns and are often triggered by exogenous processes. Exogenous processes are independent of species biology and can include habitat degradation, habitat subdivision or habitat isolation. These processes can have a substantial impact on endogenous processes by fundamentally altering species behavior. Habitat subdivision or isolation can lead to changes in dispersal or movement of species including changes to seasonal migration. These changes can lead to a decrease in a density of species, increased competition or even increased predation.

== Implications ==
=== Habitat and biodiversity loss ===
One of the major ways that habitat fragmentation affects biodiversity is by reducing the amount of suitable habitat available for organisms. Habitat fragmentation often involves both habitat destruction and the subdivision of previously continuous habitat. Plants and other sessile organisms are disproportionately affected by some types of habitat fragmentation because they cannot respond quickly to the altered spatial configuration of the habitat. Habitat fragmentation consistently reduces biodiversity by 13 to 75% and impairs key ecosystem functions by decreasing biomass and altering nutrient cycles. This underscores the severe and lasting ecological impacts of fragmentation, which could be highlighted in the sections discussing the consequences of fragmentation.

Habitat loss, which can occur through the process of habitat fragmentation, is considered to be the greatest threat to species. But, the effect of the configuration of habitat patches within the landscape, independent of the effect of the amount of habitat within the landscape (referred to as fragmentation per se), has been suggested to be small. A review of empirical studies found that, of the 381 reported significant effect of habitat fragmentation per se on species occurrences, abundances or diversity in the scientific literature, 76% were positive whereas 24% were negative. Despite these results, the scientific literature tends to emphasize negative effects more than positive effects. Positive effects of habitat fragmentation per se imply that several small patches of habitat can have higher conservation value than a single large patch of equivalent size. Land sharing strategies could therefore have more positive impacts on species than land sparing strategies. Although the negative effects of habitat loss are generally viewed to be much larger than that of habitat fragmentation, the two events are heavily connected and observations are not usually independent of one another.

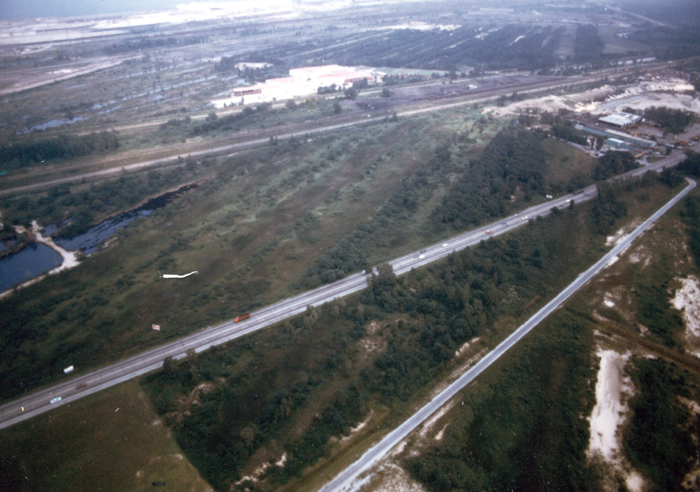
Habitat fragmented by numerous roads near the Indiana Dunes National Park.

Area is the primary determinant of the number of species in a fragment and the relative contributions of demographic and genetic processes to the risk of global population extinction depend on habitat configuration, stochastic environmental variation and species features. Minor fluctuations in climate, resources, or other factors that would be unremarkable and quickly corrected in large populations can be catastrophic in small, isolated populations. Thus fragmentation of habitat is an important cause of species extinction. Population dynamics of subdivided populations tend to vary asynchronously. In an unfragmented landscape a declining population can be "rescued" by immigration from a nearby expanding population. In fragmented landscapes, the distance between fragments may prevent this from happening. Additionally, unoccupied fragments of habitat that are separated from a source of immigrants by some barrier are less likely to be repopulated than adjoining fragments. Even small species such as the Columbia spotted frog are reliant on the rescue effect. Studies showed 25% of juveniles travel a distance over 200m compared to 4% of adults. Of these, 95% remain in their new locale, demonstrating that this journey is necessary for survival.

Additionally, habitat fragmentation leads to edge effects. Microclimatic changes in light, temperature, and wind can alter the ecology around the fragment, and in the interior and exterior portions of the fragment. Fires become more likely in the area as humidity drops and temperature and wind levels rise. Exotic and pest species may establish themselves easily in such disturbed environments, and the proximity of domestic animals often upsets the natural ecology. Also, habitat along the edge of a fragment has a different climate and favours different species from the interior habitat. Small fragments are therefore unfavourable for species that require interior habitat. The percentage preservation of contiguous habitats is closely related to both genetic and species biodiversity preservation. Generally a 10% remnant contiguous habitat will result in a 50% biodiversity loss.

Much of the remaining terrestrial wildlife habitat in many third world countries has experienced fragmentation through the development of urban expansion such as roads interfering with habitat loss. Aquatic species' habitats have been fragmented by dams and water diversions. These fragments of habitat may not be large or connected enough to support species that need a large territory where they can find mates and food. The loss and fragmentation of habitats makes it difficult for migratory species to find places to rest and feed along their migration routes.

The effects of current fragmentation will continue to emerge for decades. Extinction debts are likely to come due, although the counteracting immigration debts may never fully be paid. Indeed, the experiments here reveal ongoing losses of biodiversity and ecosystem functioning two decades or longer after fragmentation occurred. Understanding the relationship between transient and long-term dynamics is a substantial challenge that ecologists must tackle, and fragmentation experiments will be central for relating observation to theory.

=== Informed conservation ===
Habitat fragmentation is often a cause of species becoming threatened or endangered. The existence of viable habitat is critical to the survival of any species, and in many cases, the fragmentation of any remaining habitat can lead to difficult decisions for conservation biologists. Given a limited amount of resources available for conservation is it preferable to protect the existing isolated patches of habitat or to buy back land to get the largest possible contiguous piece of land. In rare cases, a conservation reliant species may gain some measure of disease protection by being distributed in isolated habitats, and when controlled for overall habitat loss some studies have shown a positive relationship between species richness and fragmentation; this phenomenon has been called the habitat amount hypothesis, though the validity of this claim has been disputed. The ongoing debate of what size fragments are most relevant for conservation is often referred to as SLOSS (Single Large or Several Small). Habitat loss in a biodiversity hotspot can result in a localized extinction crisis, generally speaking habitat loss in a hotspot location can be a good indicator or predictor of the number of threatened and extinct endemic species.

One solution to the problem of habitat fragmentation is to link the fragments by preserving or planting corridors of native vegetation. In some cases, a bridge or underpass may be enough to join two fragments. This has the potential to mitigate the problem of isolation but not the loss of interior habitat. Wildlife corridors can help animals to move and occupy new areas when food sources or other natural resources are lacking in their core habitat, and animals can find new mates in neighbouring regions so that genetic diversity can increase. Species that relocate seasonally can do so more safely and effectively when it does not interfere with human development barriers.

Due to the continuous expansion of urban landscapes, current research is looking at green roofs being possible vectors of habitat corridors. A recent study has found that green roofs are beneficial in connecting the habitats of arthropods, specifically bees and weevils.

Another mitigation measure is the enlargement of small remnants to increase the amount of interior habitat. This may be impractical since developed land is often more expensive and could require significant time and effort to restore.

The best solution is generally dependent on the particular species or ecosystem that is being considered. More mobile species, like most birds, do not need connected habitat while some smaller animals, like rodents, may be more exposed to predation in open land. These questions generally fall under the headings of metapopulations island biogeography.

=== Genetic risks ===
As the remaining habitat patches are smaller, they tend to support smaller populations of fewer species. Small populations are at an increased risk of a variety of genetic consequences that influence their long-term survival. Remnant populations often contain only a subset of the genetic diversity found in the previously continuous habitat. In these cases, processes that act upon underlying genetic diversity, such as adaptation, have a smaller pool of fitness-maintaining alleles to survive in the face of environmental change. However, in some scenarios, where subsets of genetic diversity are partitioned among multiple habitat fragments, almost all original genetic diversity can be maintained despite each individual fragment displaying a reduced subset of diversity.

==== Gene Flow and Inbreeding ====
Gene flow occurs when individuals of the same species exchange genetic information through reproduction. Populations can maintain genetic diversity through migration. When a habitat becomes fragmented and reduced in area, gene flow and migration are typically reduced. Fewer individuals will migrate into the remaining fragments, and small disconnected populations that may have once been part of a single large population will become reproductively isolated. Scientific evidence that gene flow is reduced due to fragmentation depends on the study species. While trees that have long-range pollination and dispersal mechanisms may not experience reduced gene flow following fragmentation, most species are at risk of reduced gene flow following habitat fragmentation.

Reduced gene flow, and reproductive isolation can result in inbreeding between related individuals. Inbreeding does not always result in negative fitness consequences, but when inbreeding is associated with fitness reduction it is called inbreeding depression. Inbreeding becomes of increasing concern as the level of homozygosity increases, facilitating the expression of deleterious alleles that reduce the fitness. Habitat fragmentation can lead to inbreeding depression for many species due to reduced gene flow. Inbreeding depression is associated with conservation risks, like local extinction.

==== Genetic drift ====
Small populations are more susceptible to genetic drift. Genetic drift is random changes to the genetic makeup of populations and leads to reductions in genetic diversity. The smaller the population is, the more likely genetic drift will be a driving force of evolution rather than natural selection. Because genetic drift is a random process, it does not allow species to become more adapted to their environment. Habitat fragmentation is associated with increases to genetic drift in small populations which can have negative consequences for the genetic diversity of the populations. However, research suggests that some tree species may be resilient to the negative consequences of genetic drift until population size is as small as ten individuals or less.

===== Genetic consequences of habitat fragmentation for plant populations =====
Habitat fragmentation decreases the size and increases plant populations' spatial isolation. With genetic variation and increased methods of inter-population genetic divergence due to increased effects of random genetic drift, elevating inbreeding and reducing gene flow within plant species. While genetic variation may decrease with remnant population size, not all fragmentation events lead to genetic losses and different types of genetic variation. Rarely, fragmentation can also increase gene flow among remnant populations, breaking down local genetic structure.

==== Adaptation ====
In order for populations to evolve in response to natural selection, they must be large enough that natural selection is a stronger evolutionary force than genetic drift. Recent studies on the impacts of habitat fragmentation on adaptation in some plant species have suggested that organisms in fragmented landscapes may be able to adapt to fragmentation. However, there are also many cases where fragmentation reduces adaptation capacity because of small population size.

==== Examples of impacted species ====
Some species that have experienced genetic consequences due to habitat fragmentation are listed below:

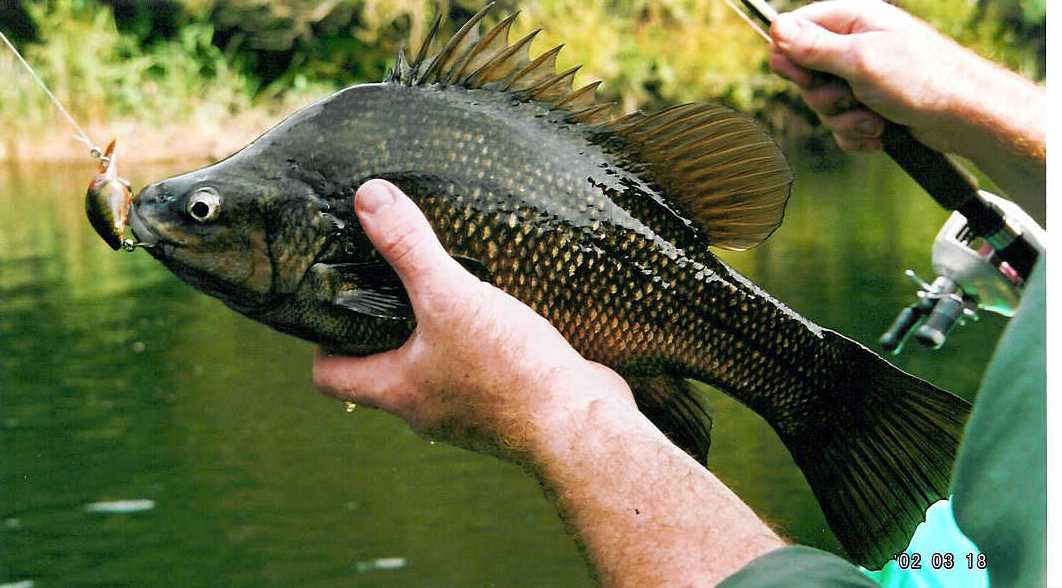
Macquarie perch

- Macquaria australasica
- Fagus sylvatica
- Betula nana
- Rhinella ornata
- Ochotona princeps
- Uta stansburiana
- Plestiodon skiltonianus
- Sceloporus occidentalis
- Chamaea fasciata

=== Effect on animal behaviours ===
Although the way habitat fragmentation affects the genetics and extinction rates of species has been heavily studied, fragmentation has also been shown to affect species' behaviours and cultures as well. This is important because social interactions can determine and have an effect on a species' fitness and survival. Habitat fragmentation alters the resources available and the structure of habitats, as a result, alters the behaviours of species and the dynamics between differing species. Behaviours affected can be within a species such as reproduction, mating, foraging, species dispersal, communication and movement patterns or can be behaviours between species such as predator-prey relationships.

==== Predation behaviours ====
Habitat fragmentation due to anthropogenic activities has been shown to greatly affect the predator-prey dynamics of many species by altering the number of species and the members of those species. This affects the natural predator-prey relationships between animals in a given community and forces them to alter their behaviours and interactions, therefore resetting the so-called "behavioral space race". The way in which fragmentation changes and re-shapes these interactions can occur in many different forms. Most prey species have patches of land that are a refuge from their predators, allowing them the safety to reproduce and raise their young. Human introduced structures such as roads and pipelines alter these areas by facilitating predator activity in these refuges, increasing predator-prey overlap. The opposite could also occur in the favour of prey, increasing prey refuge and subsequently decreasing predation rates. Fragmentation may also increase predator abundance or predator efficiency and therefore increase predation rates in this manner.

Several other factors can also increase or decrease the extent to which the shifting predator-prey dynamics affect certain species, including how diverse a predators diet is and how flexible habitat requirements are for predators and prey. Depending on which species are affected and these other factors, fragmentation and its effects on predator-prey dynamics may contribute to species extinction. In response to these new environmental pressures, new adaptive behaviours may be developed. Prey species may adapt to increased risk of predation with strategies such as altering mating tactics or changing behaviours and activities related to food and foraging.

===== Boreal woodland caribous =====
In the boreal woodland caribous of British Columbia, the effects of fragmentation are demonstrated. The species refuge area is peatland bog which has been interrupted by linear features such as roads and pipelines. These features have allowed their natural predators, the wolf, and the black bear to more efficiently travel over landscapes and between patches of land. Since their predators can more easily access the caribous' refuge, the females of the species attempt to avoid the area, affecting their reproductive behaviours and offspring produced.

==== Communication behaviours ====
Fragmentation affecting the communication behaviours of birds has been well studied in Dupont's Lark. The Larks primarily reside in regions of Spain and are a small passerine bird which uses songs as a means of cultural transmission between members of the species. The Larks have two distinct vocalizations, the song, and the territorial call. The territorial call is used by males to defend and signal territory from other male Larks and is shared between neighbouring territories when males respond to a rivals song. Occasionally it is used as a threat signal to signify an impending attack on territory. A large song repertoire can enhance a male's ability to survive and reproduce as he has a greater ability to defend his territory from other males, and a larger number of males in the species means a larger variety of songs being transmitted. Fragmentation of the Dupont's Lark territory from agriculture, forestry and urbanization appears to have a large effect on their communication structures. Males only perceive territories of a certain distance to be rivals and so isolation of territory from others due to fragmentation leads to a decrease in territorial calls as the males no longer have any reason to use it or have any songs to match.

Humans have also brought on varying implications into ecosystems which in turn affect animal behaviour and responses generated. Although there are some species which are able to survive these kinds of harsh conditions, such as, cutting down wood in the forests for pulp and paper industries, there are animals which can survive this change but some that cannot. An example includes, varying aquatic insects are able to identify appropriate ponds to lay their eggs with the aid of polarized light to guide them, however, due to ecosystem modifications caused by humans they are led onto artificial structures which emit artificial light which are induced by dry asphalt dry roads for an example.

=== Effect on microorganisms ===
While habitat fragmentation is often associated with its effects on large plant and animal populations and biodiversity, due to the interconnectedness of ecosystems there are also significant effects that it has on the microbiota of an environment. Increased fragmentation has been linked to reduced populations and diversity of fungi responsible for decomposition, as well as the insects they are host to. This has been linked to simplified food webs in highly fragmented areas compared to old growth forests. Furthermore, edge effects have been shown to result in significantly varied microenvironments compared to interior forest due to variations in light availability, presence of wind, changes in precipitation, and overall moisture content of leaf litter. These microenvironments are often not conducive to overall forest health as they enable generalist species to thrive at the expense of specialists that depend on specific environments.

=== Effect on mutualistic and antagonistic relationships ===
A metadata analysis has found that habitat fragmentation greatly affects mutualistic relationships while affecting antagonistic relationships, such as predation and herbivory, to a less degree. For example, the mutualistic relationship between Mesogyne insignis and Megachile. A study has found greater pollination and increased fruit production of M. insignis in unfragmented forests verses fragmented forests. As for an example of an antagonistic relationship of nest predation, a study found that there is no increase in nest predation on fragmented forests - thus not supporting the edge effect hypothesis.

=== Effect on ecosystem services ===
Habitat fragmentation has profound effects on ecosystem services, impacting nutrient retention, species richness, and local biophysical conditions. Fragmentation-mediated processes cause generalizable responses at the population, community, and ecosystem levels, resulting in decreased nutrient retention. Furthermore, habitat fragmentation alters relationships between biodiversity and ecosystem functioning across multiple scales, affecting both the local loss of biodiversity and the local loss of function. Moreover, fragmentation can change the microclimate at both local and regional scales, influencing biodiversity through interactions with anthropogenic climate change. Overall, habitat fragmentation significantly disrupts ecosystem services by altering nutrient retention, biodiversity, and ecosystem functioning at various spatial and temporal scales.

== Forest fragmentation ==
Forest fragmentation is a form of habitat fragmentation where forests are reduced (either naturally or man-made) to relatively small, isolated patches of forest known as forest fragments or forest remnants. The intervening matrix that separates the remaining woodland patches can be natural open areas, farmland, or developed areas. Following the principles of island biogeography, remnant woodlands act like islands of forest in a sea of pastures, fields, subdivisions, shopping malls, etc. These fragments will then begin to undergo the process of ecosystem decay.

Forest fragmentation also includes less subtle forms of discontinuities such as utility right-of-ways (ROWs). Utility ROWs are of ecological interest because they have become pervasive in many forest communities, spanning areas as large as 5 million acres in the United States. Utility ROWs include electricity transmission ROWs, gas pipeline and telecommunication ROWs. Electricity transmission ROWs are created to prevent vegetation interference with transmission lines. Some studies have shown that electricity transmission ROWs harbor more plant species than adjoining forest areas, due to alterations in the microclimate in and around the corridor. Discontinuities in forest areas associated with utility right-of-ways can serve as biodiversity havens for native bees and grassland species, as the right-of-ways are preserved in an early successional stage.

Forest fragmentation reduces food resources and habitat sources for animals thus splitting these species apart. Thus, making these animals become much more susceptible to effects of predation and making them less likely to perform interbreeding - lowering genetic diversity.

Additionally, forest fragmentation affects the native plant species present within the area by dividing large populations into smaller ones. In turn, smaller populations are more inclined to be affected by genetic drift and population performance, as well as experience increases in inbreeding activities. Moreover, fragmentation can affect the relationship present between animals and plants, such as the relationships regarding seed-dispersal or pollinator-plant relationship.

=== Implications ===
Forest fragmentation is one of the greatest threats to biodiversity in forests, especially in the tropics. The problem of habitat destruction that caused the fragmentation in the first place is compounded by:

- the inability of individual forest fragments to support viable populations, especially of large vertebrates
- the local extinction of species that do not have at least one fragment capable of supporting a viable population
- edge effects that alter the conditions of the outer areas of the fragment, greatly reducing the amount of true forest interior habitat.

The effect of fragmentation on the flora and fauna of a forest patch depends on a) the size of the patch, and b) its degree of isolation. Isolation depends on the distance to the nearest similar patch, and the contrast with the surrounding areas. For example, if a cleared area is reforested or allowed to regenerate, the increasing structural diversity of the vegetation will lessen the isolation of the forest fragments. However, when formerly forested lands are converted permanently to pastures, agricultural fields, or human-inhabited developed areas, the remaining forest fragments, and the biota within them, are often highly isolated.

Forest patches that are smaller or more isolated will lose species faster than those that are larger or less isolated. A large number of small forest "islands" typically cannot support the same biodiversity that a single contiguous forest would hold, even if their combined area is much greater than the single forest. However, forest islands in rural landscapes greatly increase their biodiversity. In the Maulino forest of Chile fragmentation appear to not affect overall plant diversity much, and tree diversity is indeed higher in fragments than in large continuous forests.

McGill University in Montreal, Quebec, Canada released a university based newspaper statement stating that 70% of the world's remaining forest stands within one kilometre of a forest edge putting biodiversity at an immense risk based on research conducted by international scientists.

Reduced fragment area, increased isolation, and increased edge initiate changes that percolate through all ecosystems. Habitat fragmentation is able to formulate persistent outcomes which can also become unexpected such as an abundance of some species and the pattern that long temporal scales are required to discern many strong system responses.

=== Sustainable forest management ===
The presence of forest fragments influences the supply of various ecosystems in adjacent agricultural fields (Mitchell et al. 2014). Mitchell et al. (2014), researched on six varying ecosystem factors such as crop production, decomposition, pesticide regulation, carbon storage, soil fertility, and water quality regulation in soybean fields through separate distances by nearby forest fragments which all varied in isolation and size across an agricultural landscape in Quebec, Canada. Sustainable forest management can be achieved in several ways including by managing forests for ecosystem services (beyond simple provisioning), through government compensation schemes, and through effective regulation and legal frameworks. The only realistic method of conserving forests is to apply and practice sustainable forest management to risk further loss.

There is a high industrial demand for wood, pulp, paper, and other resources which the forest can provide with, thus businesses which will want more access to the cutting of forests to gain those resources. The rainforest alliance has efficiently been able to put into place an approach to sustainable forest management, and they established this in the late 1980s. Their conservation was deemed successful as it has saved over nearly half a billion acres of land around the world.

A few approaches and measures which can be taken in order to conserve forests are methods by which erosion can be minimized, waste is properly disposed, conserve native tree species to maintain genetic diversity, and setting aside forestland (provides habitat for critical wildlife species). Additionally, forest fires can also occur frequently and measures can also be taken to further prevent forest fires from occurring. For example, in Guatemala's culturally and ecologically significant Petén region, researchers were able to find over a 20-year period, actively managed FSC-certified forests experienced substantially lower rates of deforestation than nearby protected areas, and forest fires only affected 0.1 percent of certified land area, compared to 10.4 percent of protected areas. However, it must be duly noted that short term decisions regarding forest sector employment and harvest practices can have long-term effects on biodiversity. Planted forests become increasingly important as they supply approximately a quarter of global industrial roundwood production and are predicted to account for 50% of global output within two decades (Brown, 1998; Jaakko Poyry, 1999). Although there have been many difficulties, the implementation of forest certification has been quite prominent in being able to raise effective awareness and disseminating knowledge on a holistic concept, embracing economic, environmental and social issues, worldwide. While also providing a tool for a range of other applications than assessment of sustainability, such as e.g. verifying carbon sinks.

== Approaches to understanding habitat fragmentation ==
Two approaches are typically used to understand habitat fragmentation and its ecological impacts.

=== Species-oriented approach ===
The species-oriented approach focuses specifically on individual species and how they each respond to their environment and habitat changes with in it. This approach can be limited because it does only focus on individual species and does not allow for a broad view of the impacts of habitat fragmentation across species.

==== Pattern-oriented approach ====
The pattern-oriented approach is based on land cover and its patterning in correlation with species occurrences. One model of study for landscape patterning is the patch-matrix-corridor model developed by Richard Forman The pattern-oriented approach focuses on land cover defined by human means and activities. This model has stemmed from island biogeography and tries to infer causal relationships between the defined landscapes and the occurrence of species or groups of species within them. The approach has limitations in its collective assumptions across species or landscapes which may not account for variations amongst them.

==== Variegation model ====
The other model is the variegation model. Variegated landscapes retain much of their natural vegetation but are intermixed with gradients of modified habitat. This model of habitat fragmentation typically applies to landscapes that are modified by agriculture. In contrast to the fragmentation model that is denoted by isolated patches of habitat surrounded by unsuitable landscape environments, the variegation model applies to landscapes modified by agriculture where small patches of habitat remain near the remnant original habitat. In between these patches are a matrix of grassland that is often modified versions of the original habitat. These areas do not present as much of a barrier to native species.

== See also ==
- Empty forest
- Extinction vortex
- Gene pool
- Genetic erosion
- Habitat conservation
- Habitat corridor
- Habitat destruction
- Landscape connectivity
- Landscape ecology
- Patch dynamics
- Reproductive isolation
- Restoration ecology
- Road kill
- Wildlife corridor
- Wildlife crossing

== Bibliography ==
- Lindenmayer D.B & Fischer J (2013) Habitat Fragmentation and Landscape Change: An Ecological and Conservation Synthesis (Island Press)
