= Metacommunity =

Group of communities in ecology

An ecological metacommunity is a set of interacting communities which are linked by the dispersal of multiple, potentially interacting species. The term is derived from the field of community ecology, which is primarily concerned with patterns of species distribution, abundance and interactions. Metacommunity ecology combines the importance of local factors (environmental conditions, competition, predation) and regional factors (dispersal of individuals, immigration, emigration) to explain patterns of species distributions that happen in different spatial scales.

For instance, recent research on Amazonian dragonflies revealed that species with distinct reproductive strategies respond differently to environmental gradients: species with specialized oviposition habits exhibited structured, discrete community replacements across gradients, while generalist species showed individualistic, gradual responses, illustrating the interplay of local and regional factors in shaping metacommunities.

== Frameworks ==
There are four theoretical frameworks, or unifying themes, that each detail specific mechanistic processes useful for predicting empirical community patterns. These are the patch dynamics, species sorting, source–sink dynamics (or mass effect) and neutral model frameworks. Patch dynamics models describe species composition among multiple, identical patches, such as islands. In this framework, species are able to persist on patches through tradeoffs in colonization ability and competitive ability, where less competitive species can disperse to unoccupied patches faster than they go extinct in others. Species sorting models describe variation in abundance and composition within the metacommunity due to individual species responses to environmental heterogeneity, such that certain local conditions may favor certain species and not others. Under this perspective, species are able to persist in patches with suitable environmental conditions resulting in a strong correlation between local species composition and the environment. This model represents the classical theories of the niche-centric era of G. Evelyn Hutchinson and Robert MacArthur. Source-sink models describe a framework in which dispersal and environmental heterogeneity interact to determine local and regional abundance and composition. This framework is derived from the metapopulation ecology term describing source–sink dynamics at the population level. High levels of dispersal among habitat patches allow populations to be maintained in environments that are normally outside the species environmental range. Finally, the neutral perspective describes a framework where species are essentially equivalent in their competitive and dispersal abilities, and local and regional composition and abundance are determined primarily by stochastic demographic processes and dispersal limitation. The neutral perspective was recently popularized by Stephen P. Hubbell following his groundbreaking work on the unified neutral theory of biodiversity.
