= Relative abundance =

Relative abundance can refer to

- Relative species abundance in ecological communities.
- Isotopic abundance of isotopes of a chemical element in nature.
