= Functional equivalence =

Functional equivalence can refer to:

- Dynamic and formal equivalence in biblical translation
- Functional equivalence (ecology), a concept in community ecology
- Formal equivalence checking in formal methods
