= Neutral theory =

Neutral theory may refer to one of these two related theories:

- Neutral theory of molecular evolution
- Unified neutral theory of biodiversity
