= Functional equivalence (ecology) =

In ecology, functional equivalence (or functional redundancy) is the ecological phenomenon that multiple species representing a variety of taxonomic groups can share similar, if not identical, roles in ecosystem functionality (e.g., nitrogen fixers, algae scrapers, scavengers). This phenomenon can apply to both plant and animal taxa. The idea was originally presented in 2005 by Stephen Hubbell, a plant ecologist at the University of Georgia. This idea has led to a new paradigm for species-level classification – organizing species into groups based on functional similarity rather than morphological or evolutionary history. In the natural world, several examples of functional equivalence among different taxa have emerged analogously.

== Plant-pollinator relationships ==
One example of functional equivalence is demonstrated in plant-pollinator relationships, whereby a certain plant species may evolve flower morphology that selects for pollination by a host of taxonomically-unrelated species to provide the same function (fruit production following pollination). For example, the herbaceous plant spiny madwort (Hormathophylla spinosa) grows flowers that are shaped so that taxonomically unrelated pollinators behave almost identically during pollination. From the plant's perspective, each of these pollinators are functionally equivalent and thus are not subjected to specific selective pressures Variation in the shape and structure of both flower and seed morphology can be a source of selective pressure for animal species to evolve a variety of morphological features, yet also provide the same function to the plant.

== Plant-animal seed dispersal mechanisms ==
Plant-animal interactions in terms of seed dispersal are another example of functional equivalence. Evidence has shown that, over the course of millions of years, most plants have maintained evolutionary trait stability in terms of the size and shape of their fruits. However, the animal species that consume and disperse the seeds within the fruits have evolved physically at a faster rate than the plants they feed off of. In other words, animal species have been changing and evolving more than the plants have been changing their seed and fruit morphology. Functional equivalence of the animal species consuming and dispersing the seeds can account for the ability for these plants to continue to survive without genetic changes to their fruit/seed morphology. As with the Hormathophylla example above, the plant species are not subjected to selective pressures the same way that animals are.

== Metabolite production ==
Another instance is the analogous evolution of plant metabolite production as a response to herbivory. In this case, different plant species have evolved different mechanisms of chemical repellant to herbivores, yet each response provides the same function – resistance to herbivory. In some cases, plants living in completely different environments (geographic separation) and that are not taxonomically related can evolve different metabolites that provide the same function to the plant - protection against herbivory. This is another example of functional equivalency among taxonomically unrelated species.

== Symbiotic relationships ==
Numerous instances of functional equivalence may exist within microbial symbionts and their associated host. Some examples of these include the large diversity of microbes within termite digestive tracts and the human gut microbiome. In these environments, a vast array of taxonomically diverse organisms provide the function of food digestion and cellulose breakdown. These microbial organisms most likely evolved under similar conditions but at different points in time, and they have now been discovered interacting with one another and providing the same function to their host organism.

== Functional equivalency and biodiversity ==
Recently, biologists have used the idea of functional equivalency, sometimes referred to as functional redundancy, to make predictions about how to best manage ecosystems and their microcosms. It is a common misconception that high degrees of taxonomic diversity within an ecosystem will ultimately result in a healthier, highly functional system. For example, an ecological microcosm consisting of 30 species of legume plants (which add fixed nitrogen to the soil) is only fulfilling one ecosystem function (nitrogen fixation) despite being rich taxonomically. On the other hand, an ecosystem containing low taxonomic diversity but high functional diversity may be more sustainable. Recent studies have argued that an ecosystem can maintain optimum health by having each ecosystem functional group represented by many taxonomically unrelated species (functional equivalency). In other words, an ecosystem can potentially be at its highest level of integrity if it is both functionally rich and taxonomically rich.

== Skepticism ==
Some biologists have questioned the importance of the functional equivalence theory. For example, Loreau points out that, in actual testing of functional equivalency, it is hard to draw concise conclusions as to whether or not the theory is sound due to the complexity and oversimplification of the theory itself. For example, many studies testing the effects of species loss and functional redundancy rarely address the ambiguity of whether or not functionality is acting at the individual or population level and the possibility for multiple niche dimensions to be overlapping with one another.

Ultimately, the hypothesis of functional equivalence is one that is well recognized among systems ecologists and evolutionary biologists and is an active area of modern research to determine quantitative examples. However, further research is needed in order to quantify the effects of species loss on ecosystem function in order to provide more evidence to support the hypothesis of functional equivalence.

== See also ==
- Unified neutral theory of biodiversity
