= The Theory of Island Biogeography =

1967 book by Robert MacArthur and Edward O. Wilson

- Cover of the first edition
- Authors: Robert MacArthur; Edward O. Wilson
- Illustrator: John Kyrk
- Language: English
- Subject: Insular biogeography
- Publisher: Princeton University Press
- Publication date: 1967
- Publication place: United States
- Media type: Print (Hardcover and Paperback)
- Pages: 203
- ISBN: 0691088365

The Theory of Island Biogeography is a 1967 book by the ecologist Robert MacArthur and the biologist Edward O. Wilson. It is widely regarded as a seminal work in island biogeography and ecology. The Princeton University Press reprinted the book in 2001 as a part of the "Princeton Landmarks in Biology" series. The book popularized the theory that insular biota maintain a dynamic equilibrium between immigration and extinction rates. The book also popularized the concepts and terminology of r/K selection theory.

== Background ==
The Theory of Island Biogeography has its roots in Wilson's work on the ants of Melanesia. MacArthur synthesized Wilson's ideas about competition, colonization and equilibrium into a simple graphical representation of immigration and extinction curves, from which one can determine the equilibrial species number on an island. MacArthur and Wilson's ideas were first presented in a paper published in 1963, and were further developed into a book.

== Summary ==
=== Introduction ===
In the introductory chapter, MacArthur and Wilson highlight the significance of studying island biogeography. Since islands are less complex and more numerous than larger ecosystems, islands provide better opportunities to develop insights and perform replicable field research. Given that insular microcosms are common to all ecosystems, principles from island biogeography can be applied generally.

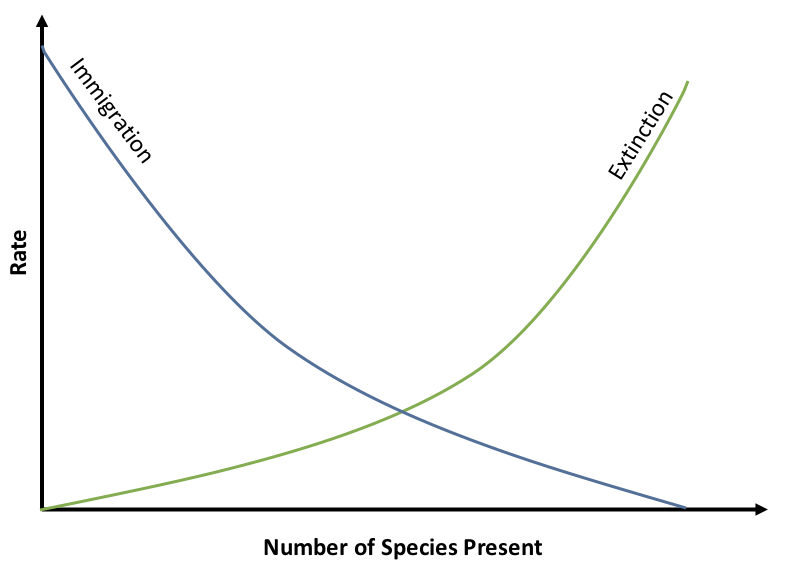
This graph portrays the immigration rate of new species and the extinction rate of resident species versus the number of species present on an island. The intersection point gives the equilibrial species number.

=== Area-diversity pattern ===
In Chapters 2 and 3, MacArthur and Wilson postulate that insular species richness depends on island size and isolation from source regions. The authors present an equilibrium model that is based on the following concept: when there is an addition of the number of species on an island, the island's immigration rate of new species will decrease while the extinction rate of resident species will increase. MacArthur and Wilson thus assume that there will be an equilibrial point where the immigration rate equals the extinction rate. They further hypothesize that an increase in island size will lower extinction curves while a decrease in distance between the island and the source region will raise immigration curves. Since the intersection of immigration and extinction rate curves determines the species number, the authors predict that larger islands will have more species than smaller islands (assuming these islands are comparably isolated) and isolated islands will have fewer species than islands more proximal to source regions (assuming these islands are equally large). There is additional discourse on how insular clusters and stepping stones affect this model.

=== Modeling colonization and dispersion ===
Chapter 4 discusses survivorship theory. The authors describe a model which states that the probability for successful colonization is dependent on birth rate, death rate, and carrying capacity of the environment. From this model, conclusions are made on the average survival time for a propagule's offspring, the average survival time of a saturated population, and characteristics of successful propagules.

In Chapter 5, MacArthur and Wilson examine why species can be excluded from insular environments and how the niche of a species changes after introduction. The authors surmise that pioneering species can be excluded for the following reasons: the island has saturated levels of pre-existing competition, the pioneering species cannot maintain a population large enough to avoid extinction, and the island hosts too many or too few natural predators. When a species colonizes a new area, the authors state that the species will either shift, expand or contract its realized niche.

Chapter 6 is a theoretical exploration of dispersal models. The authors consider how insular stepping stones affect the dispersion of species—particularly, the effects that size and isolation of stepping stones have on dispersion. Further consideration is given to how dispersal curves and average distance travelled by pioneers impacts this study.

In Chapter 7, the authors state that there are generally three consecutive phases to the evolution of populations after colonization. Initially, there is a trend for colonizers to evolve from r-strategists into K-strategists. The founder effect may also influence colonizing populations during this first phase. The second phase is marked by long term adaptations to the local environment. In this period, abilities for dispersal are commonly reduced, and colonizers will either differentiate or assimilate with competing species. In the third phase, the evolution of colonizing populations may result in speciation and/or adaptive radiation.

== Field testing ==
The insular biota equilibrium theory was experimentally tested by E. O. Wilson and his then-graduate student Daniel Simberloff in six small mangrove islands in the Florida Keys. The islands were fumigated to clear the arthropod populations. Immigration of species onto the island was then observed in a first and second year census. Wilson and Simberloff confirmed that there was an inverse relationship between the number of species on an island and the distance to the source region as predicted in The Theory of Island Biogeography.

== Impact ==
=== Applications ===
MacArthur and Wilson's theory of island biogeography has been widely applied outside of island ecosystems. For microbiota, the theory has been applied to the distribution of ectomycorrhizal fungi on trees, the distribution of bacteria in water-filled treeholes, and the distribution of fungi among shrubs. While for flora and fauna, the theory's predictions have been realized with the species richness of plants on mountains and with the species richness of aquatic snails in bodies of water. Novel applications looked at plants as islands for insect species and the dependence of the species richness of mites on the areas of the host ranges of rodent species. MacArthur and Wilson's work has been used as a basis in other ecological theories, notably the unified neutral theory of biodiversity, and has been foundational for the fields of landscape ecology, invasion biology, and conservation biology.

=== Criticism ===
Several studies have disputed the underlying assumptions in MacArthur and Wilson's theory of island biogeography: specifically, the interchangeability of species and islands, the independence between immigration and extinction, and the insignificance of non-equilibrial processes. The Island Biogeography theory can also be applied to habitat fragmentation. However, limitations and nuances like edge effects, matrix effects, and community level changes inhibit this theory from being universally applied to all systems. In the 2001 preface, Wilson stated that "the flaws of the book lie in its oversimplification and incompleteness".

=== Legacy ===
In 2007, a symposium was held at Harvard University honoring the fortieth anniversary of The Theory of Island Biogeography. Following this conference, a collection of papers was published in the book The Theory of Island Biogeography Revisited.

The SLOSS Debate is based on the authors suggestion that a single large reserve was preferable to several small reserves.

== See also ==
- Landscape ecology
- R/K selection theory
- Conservation biology
- Unified neutral theory of biodiversity
