= Integrodifference equation =

Recurrence equation on a function space, that involves integration

In mathematics, an integrodifference equation is a recurrence relation on a function space, of the following form:

$$n_{t+1}(x) = \int_{\Omega} k(x, y)\, f(n_t(y))\, dy,$$

where $\{n_t\}\,$ is a sequence in the function space and $\Omega\,$ is the domain of those functions. In most applications, for any $y\in\Omega\,$, $k(x,y)\,$ is a probability density function on $\Omega\,$. Note that in the definition above, $n_t$ can be vector valued, in which case each element of $\{n_t\}$ has a scalar valued integrodifference equation associated with it. Integrodifference equations are widely used in mathematical biology, especially theoretical ecology, to model the dispersal and growth of populations. In this case, $n_t(x)$ is the population size or density at location $x$ at time $t$, $f(n_t(x))$ describes the local population growth at location $x$ and $k(x,y)$, is the probability of moving from point $y$ to point $x$, often referred to as the dispersal kernel. Integrodifference equations are most commonly used to describe univoltine populations, including, but not limited to, many arthropod, and annual plant species. However, multivoltine populations can also be modeled with integrodifference equations, as long as the organism has non-overlapping generations. In this case, $t$ is not measured in years, but rather the time increment between broods.

== Convolution kernels and invasion speeds ==
In one spatial dimension, the dispersal kernel often depends only on the distance between the source and the destination, and can be written as $k(x-y)$. In this case, some natural conditions on f and k imply that there is a well-defined spreading speed for waves of invasion generated from compact initial conditions. The wave speed is often calculated by studying the linearized equation

$$n_{t+1} = \int_{-\infty}^{\infty} k(x-y) R n_t(y) dy$$

where $R = \left.\dfrac{df}{dn}\right|_{n=0}$. This can be written as the convolution

$$n_{t+1} = f'(0) k * n_t$$

Using a moment-generating-function transformation

$$M(s) = \int_{-\infty}^{\infty} e^{sx} n(x) dx$$

it has been shown that the critical wave speed

$$c^* = \min_{ w > 0 } \left[\frac{1}{w} \ln \left( R \int_{-\infty}^{\infty} k(s) e^{w s} ds \right) \right]$$

Other types of equations used to model population dynamics through space include reaction–diffusion equations and metapopulation equations. However, diffusion equations do not as easily allow for the inclusion of explicit dispersal patterns and are only biologically accurate for populations with overlapping generations. Metapopulation equations are different from integrodifference equations in the fact that they break the population down into discrete patches rather than a continuous landscape.
