= National Council for Science and the Environment =

The National Council for Science and the Environment (NCSE) is a U.S.-based nonpartisan, non-profit organization which has a mission to improve the scientific basis of environmental decision-making. NCSE was founded in 1990. In January 2021, NCSE became the Global Council for Science and the Environment (GCSE).
