= Stephen P. Hubbell =

American ecologist

- Education: Carleton College, B.A. University of California, Berkeley, PhD
- Occupation: Ecologist
- Notable work: The Unified Neutral Theory of Biodiversity and Biogeography
- Awards: International Prize for Biology (2016)

Stephen P. Hubbell (born February 17, 1942) is an American ecologist known for his work on tropical rainforests, theoretical ecology, and biodiversity. He is a professor emeritus at the University of Georgia and the University of California, Los Angeles.

Hubbell is the author of the unified neutral theory of biodiversity and biogeography, former chair of the National Council for Science and the Environment, co-founder of the CTFS Forest Global Earth Observatory, a researcher at the Smithsonian Tropical Research Institute, and a fellow of the American Academy of Arts and Sciences. In 2016, he was awarded the International Prize for Biology.

== Life and career ==
Hubbell received a B.A. in biology from Carleton College in 1963 and a PhD in zoology from University of California, Berkeley in 1969.

He is author of the unified neutral theory of biodiversity and biogeography (UNTB), which seeks to explain the diversity and relative abundance of species in ecological communities not by niche differences but by stochastic processes (random walk) among ecologically equivalent species. Hubbell is also a senior staff scientist at the Smithsonian Tropical Research Institute in Balboa, Panama. He is also well known for tropical forest studies. In 1980, he and Robin B. Foster of the Field Museum in Chicago, launched the first of the 50 hectare forest dynamics studies on Barro Colorado Island in Panama. This plot became the flagship of a global network of large permanent forest dynamics plots, all following identical measurement protocols. This global network now has more than 70 plots in 28 countries, and these plots contain more than 12000 tree species and 7 million individual trees that are tagged, mapped, and monitored long-term for growth, survival and recruitment. The Center for Tropical Forest Science coordinates research across global network of plots through the Smithsonian Tropical Research Institute. The program has expanded into the temperate zone, and is now known as the Forest Global Earth Observatory Network or ForestGEO.

In 1988, while a Professor at Princeton University, he founded the Committee for the National Institutes of the Environments (CNIE), a non-profit organization in Washington, D.C., on his fellowship from the Pew Charitable Trusts. The goal of the CNIE was to promote the creation of a government agency called the National Institutes of the Environment (NIE), modeled on the National Institutes of Health. After a dozen years, the organization became the National Council for Science and the Environment, whose mission is "to improve the scientific basis of environmental decision-making."

Hubbell was born in Gainesville, Florida. He earned his doctorate in zoology at the University of California, Berkeley, in 1969. As a professor at the University of Michigan, he taught graduate courses for the Organization for Tropical Studies in Costa Rica. Later, at Princeton University, as a professor of ecology and evolutionary biology, he continued study of the population biology of tropical trees.

In 2003, Hubbell became Distinguished Research Professor in the Department of Plant Biology at the University of Georgia.

As a Fellow at the Pew Institute for Ocean Science, Hubbell initiated the establishment of the National Council for Science and the Environment (NCSE), which works with the parties that create and use environmental knowledge to influence environmental decisions.

Hubbell is married to evolutionary ecologist Patricia Adair Gowaty, who is also a Distinguished Professor at the University of California, Los Angeles.

== Honors and awards ==
- American Association for the Advancement of Science, Fellow, 1980
- Pew Fellows Program in Conservation and the Environment, Fellow, 1990
- National Council for Science and the Environment, Chair, 1991–
- American Academy of Arts and Sciences, Fellow, 2003
- W.S. Cooper Award, Ecological Society of America, 2006
- Eminent Ecologist Award, Ecological Society of America, 2009
- Inaugural Fellow, Ecological Society of America, 2012
- International Prize for Biology, 2016

== Publications ==
- Hubbell, S.P. (2001). The Unified Neutral Theory of Biodiversity and Biogeography. Princeton University Press. ISBN 0-691-02128-7.
