= Robert H. MacArthur =

Canadian-American ecologist (1930–1972)

Robert Helmer MacArthur
- Born: April 7, 1930; Toronto, Ontario, Canada
- Died: November 1, 1972 (aged 42)
- Education: Marlboro College (BA); Brown University (AM); Yale University (PhD)
- Known for: Island biogeography Limiting Similarity Optimal foraging theory
- Spouse: Elizabeth Bayles Whittemore
- Children: 4
- Awards: National Academy of Sciences (1969)
- Scientific career
- Fields: Community ecology; Population ecology
- Workplaces: University of Pennsylvania; Princeton University
- Thesis: Population Ecology of Some Warblers of Northeastern Coniferous Forests (1957)
- Doctoral advisor: G. Evelyn Hutchinson
- Other academic advisors: David Lack

Robert Helmer MacArthur (April 7, 1930 – November 1, 1972) was a Canadian-born American ecologist who made a major impact on many areas of community and population ecology. He is considered to be one of the founders of ecology.

== Early life and education ==
MacArthur was born on April 7, 1930, in Toronto, Ontario, to John Wood MacArthur and Olive Turner in 1930. He later moved to Marlboro, Vermont, as his father moved from the University of Toronto to Marlboro College. MacArthur received his Bachelor's degree in mathematics from Marlboro College, followed by a Master's degree in mathematics from Brown University in 1953. A student of G. Evelyn Hutchinson, MacArthur earned his Ph.D. from Yale University in 1957; his thesis was on the division of ecological niches among five warbler species in the conifer forests of Maine and Vermont. From 1957 to 1958, MacArthur worked as a postdoc with David Lack.

== Career ==
MacArthur was a professor at the University of Pennsylvania, 1958–65, and professor of biology at Princeton University, 1965–72. He played an important role in the development of niche partitioning, and with E.O. Wilson he co-authored The Theory of Island Biogeography (1967), a work which changed the field of biogeography, drove community ecology and led to the development of modern landscape ecology. His emphasis on hypothesis testing helped change ecology from a primarily descriptive field into an experimental field, and drove the development of theoretical ecology.

At Princeton, MacArthur served as the general editor of the series Monographs in Population Biology, and helped to found the journal Theoretical Population Biology. He also wrote Geographical Ecology: Patterns in the Distribution of Species (1972), which summarizes much of his life's work. He was elected to the National Academy of Sciences in 1969.

=== The theory of island biogeography ===
Robert MacArthur, in collaboration with Edward O. Wilson, developed the influential theory of island biogeography, which revolutionized how ecologists understand species diversity and distribution. Their seminal 1967 book, The Theory of Island Biogeography, introduced the concept of a dynamic equilibrium between immigration and extinction rates as determinants of species richness on islands. They also coined the r- and K-selection theory, which describes contrasting reproductive strategies: r-selected species maximize growth rates in unpredictable environments, while K-selected species emphasize efficiency and competition in stable environments.

Their equilibrium theory has been extensively tested and generally supported by empirical studies. For instance, researchers have validated the predictions regarding the effects of island size and isolation on species diversity through observations in archipelagos like the Galápagos and experimental work on mangrove islands. The theory also laid the foundation for metapopulation and landscape ecology, broadening its influence far beyond island studies.

=== Niche theory ===
In their 1967 paper, MacArthur and Richard Levins formalized the concept of limiting similarity, showing mathematically that there is an upper limit to how similar coexisting species can be in their resource use. This work provided a theoretical foundation for understanding the conditions under which species with overlapping niches can coexist.

Earlier, MacArthur had demonstrated niche partitioning empirically in his groundbreaking 1958 paper on warblers (Dendroica species) in northeastern forests. By observing how different warbler species foraged at varying heights and parts of trees, he provided one of the first clear examples of how niche differentiation allows species to coexist.

MacArthur also contributed to the theory of species abundance distributions with his "broken stick model," first proposed in 1957. This model likens the division of resources in an ecosystem to breaking a stick into randomly sized pieces, predicting the relative abundance of species in a community. While later models (e.g., the log-normal distribution) gained prominence, the broken stick model remains a landmark in the history of ecological theory.

=== Consumer-resource theory ===
MacArthur was a pioneer in developing mathematical models for consumer-resource dynamics, aiming to explain how interactions between species shape ecological communities. He introduced a general framework for consumer-resource interactions, which is widely used by theoretical modelers today and forms the basis of modern coexistence theory. He also used his model to demonstrate that increasing the number of species reduces a community's stability, a precursor to debates on the "diversity-stability" hypothesis.

One of his key contributions was identifying a minimization principle for consumer-resource dynamics. He showed that these systems tend to minimize a quantity related to resource overlap, providing a theoretical foundation for understanding competitive exclusion and coexistence.

In collaboration with Michael Rosenzweig, MacArthur helped develop the Rosenzweig-MacArthur model in the early 1960s. This predator-prey model incorporates a type II functional response, where the predator’s consumption rate saturates with increasing prey density. Their model is notable for predicting population cycles in predator-prey interactions, which occur due to the lag between prey growth and predator consumption. This work remains central to the study of ecological dynamics.

== Death ==
MacArthur died of renal cancer on November 1, 1972.

== See also ==
- Island biogeography
- Optimal foraging theory
- Robert H. MacArthur Award
- Research Gate
- Edward O. Wilson
