= History of speciation =

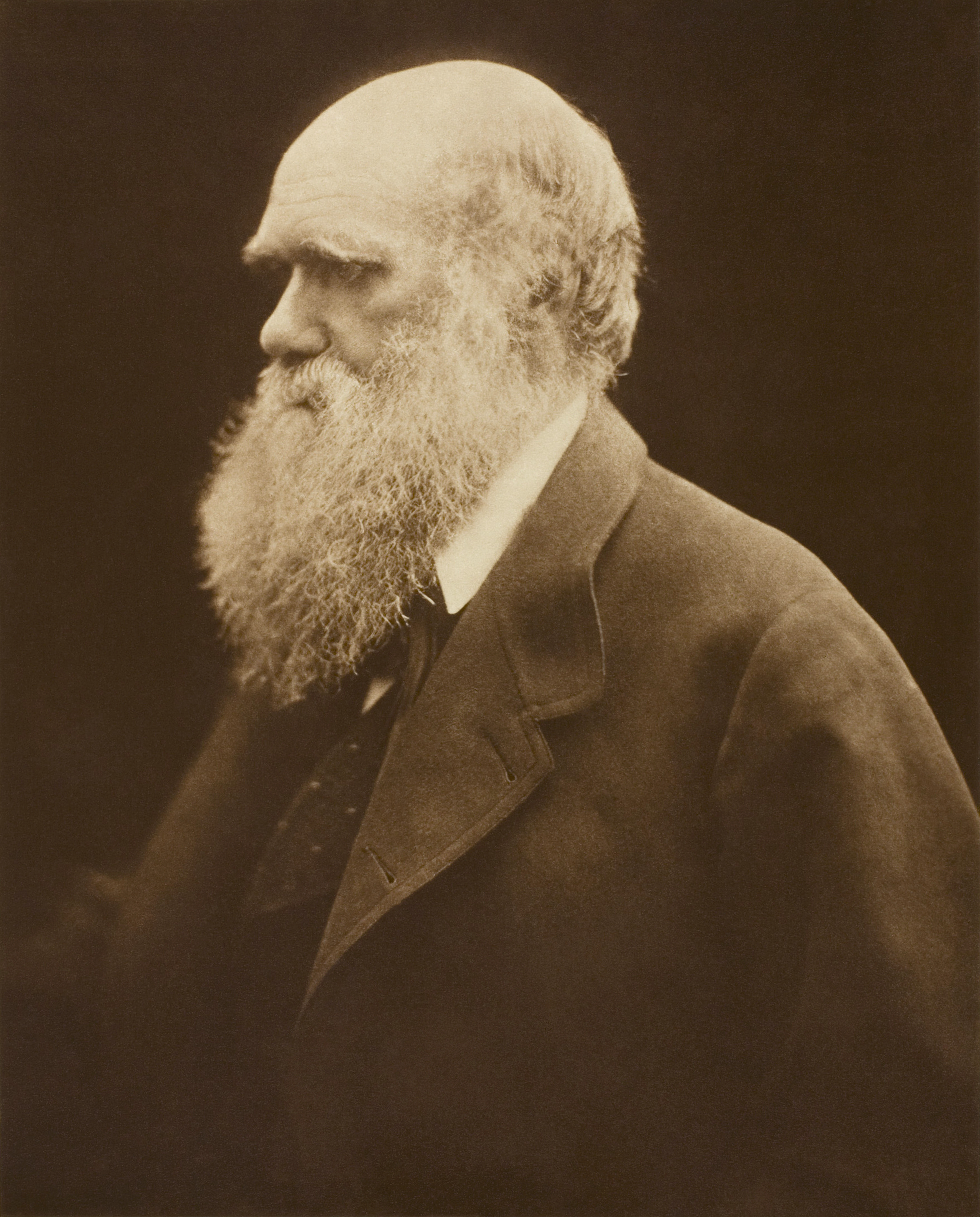
Charles Darwin in 1868

The scientific study of speciation — how species evolve to become new species — began around the time of Charles Darwin in the middle of the 19th century. Many naturalists at the time recognized the relationship between biogeography (the way species are distributed) and the evolution of species. The 20th century saw the growth of the field of speciation, with major contributors such as Ernst Mayr researching and documenting species' geographic patterns and relationships. The field grew in prominence with the modern evolutionary synthesis in the early part of that century. Since then, research on speciation has expanded immensely.

The language of speciation has grown more complex. Debate over classification schemes on the mechanisms of speciation and reproductive isolation continue. The 21st century has seen a resurgence in the study of speciation, with new techniques such as molecular phylogenetics and systematics. Speciation has largely been divided into discrete modes that correspond to rates of gene flow between two incipient populations. Current research has driven the development of alternative schemes and the discovery of new processes of speciation.

== Early history ==
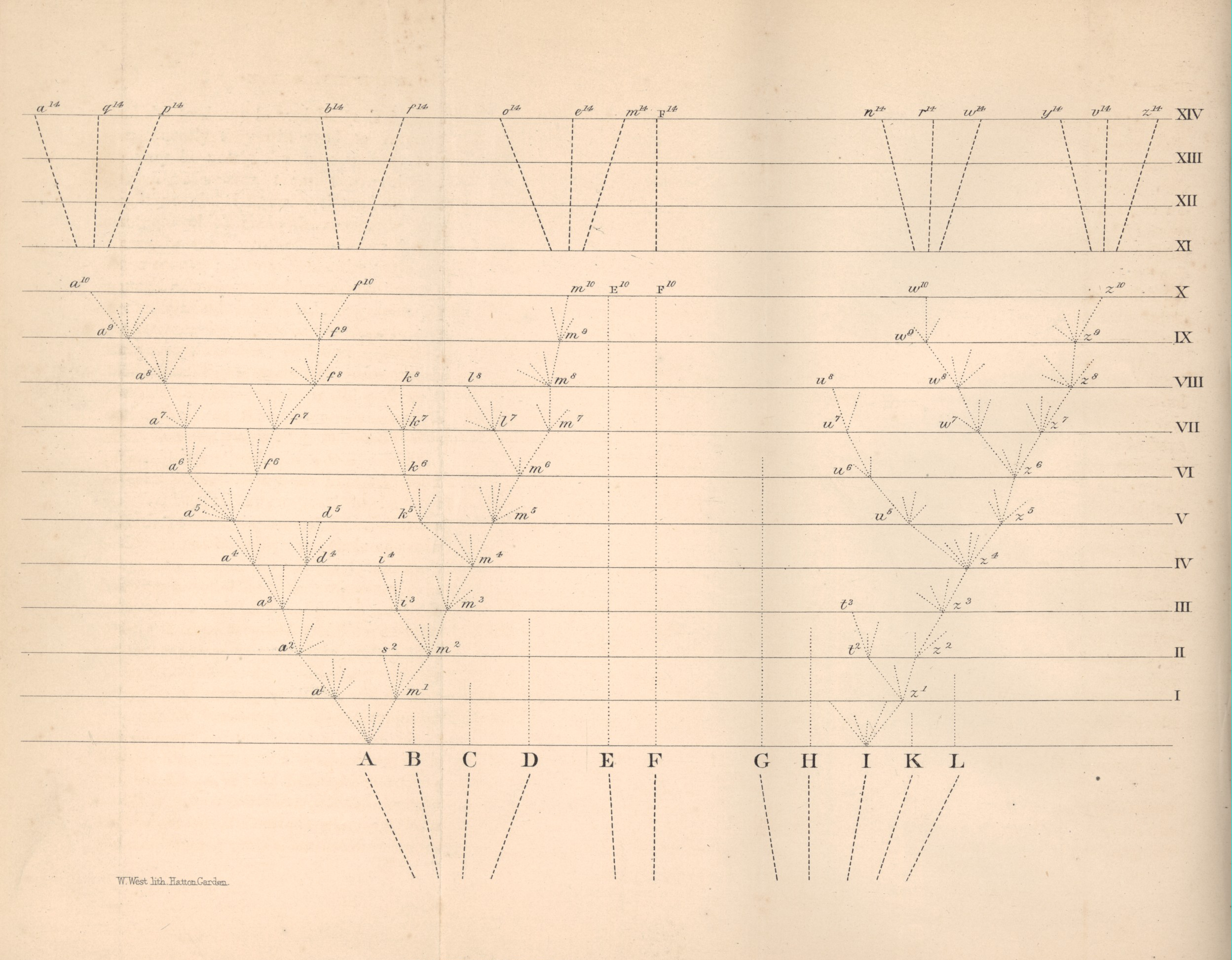
The only figure in Darwin's 1859 On the Origin of Species, a tree of lineages splitting to form new species

Charles Darwin introduced the idea that species could evolve and split into separate lineages, referring to it as specification in his 1859 book On the Origin of Species. It was not until 1906 that the modern term speciation was coined by the biologist Orator F. Cook. Darwin, in his 1859 publication, focused primarily on the changes that can occur within a species, and less on how species may divide into two. It is almost universally accepted that Darwin's book did not directly address its title. Darwin instead saw speciation as occurring by species entering new ecological niches.

=== Darwin's views ===
Controversy exists as to whether Charles Darwin recognized a true geographical-based model of speciation in his publication On the Origin of Species. In chapter 11, "Geographical Distribution", Darwin discusses geographic barriers to migration, stating for example that "barriers of any kind, or obstacles to free migration, are related in a close and important manner to the differences between the productions of various regions [of the world]". F. J. Sulloway contends that Darwin's position on speciation was "misleading" at the least and may have later misinformed Wagner and David Starr Jordan into believing that Darwin viewed sympatric speciation as the most important mode of speciation. Nevertheless, Darwin never fully accepted Wagner's concept of geographical speciation.

The evolutionary biologist James Mallet maintains that the mantra repeated concerning Darwin's Origin of Species book having never actually discussed speciation is specious. The claim began with Thomas Henry Huxley and George Romanes (contemporaries of Darwin's), who declared that Darwin failed to explain the origins of inviability and sterility in hybrids. Similar claims were promulgated by the mutationist school of thought during the late 20th century, and even after the modern evolutionary synthesis by Richard Goldschmidt. Another strong proponent of this view about Darwin came from Mayr. Mayr maintained that Darwin was unable to address the problem of speciation, as he did not define species using the biological species concept. However, Mayr's view has not been entirely accepted, as Darwin's transmutation notebooks contained writings concerning the role of isolation in the splitting of species. Furthermore, many of Darwin's ideas on speciation largely match the modern theories of both adaptive radiation and ecological speciation.

=== Darwin's dilemmas ===
In addressing the question of the origin of species, there are two key issues: (1) what are the evolutionary mechanisms of speciation, and (2) what accounts for the separateness and individuality of species in the biota? Since Charles Darwin's time, efforts to understand the nature of species have primarily focused on the first aspect, and it is now widely agreed that a critical factor behind the origin of new species is reproductive isolation. Darwin also considered the second aspect of the origin of species.

Darwin was perplexed by the clustering of organisms into species. Chapter 6 of Darwin's book is entitled "Difficulties of the Theory." In discussing these "difficulties" he noted "Firstly, why, if species have descended from other species by insensibly fine gradations, do we not everywhere see innumerable transitional forms? Why is not all nature in confusion instead of the species being, as we see them, well defined?" This dilemma can be referred to as the absence or rarity of transitional varieties in habitat space.

Another dilemma, related to the first one, is the absence or rarity of transitional varieties in time. Darwin pointed out that by the theory of natural selection "innumerable transitional forms must have existed," and wondered "why do we not find them embedded in countless numbers in the crust of the earth." That clearly defined species actually do exist in nature in both space and time implies that some fundamental feature of natural selection operates to generate and maintain species.

A possible explanation for how these dilemmas can be resolved is discussed in the article Speciation in the section "Effect of sexual reproduction on species formation."

== Biogeographic influence ==
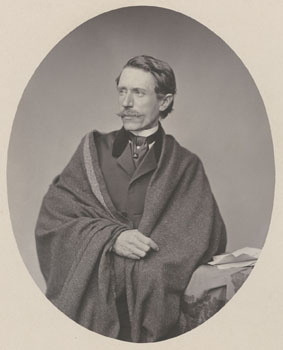
The German traveller Moritz Wagner (1813–1887)

Recognition of geographic factors involved in species populations was present even before Darwin, with many naturalists aware of the role of isolation in species relationships. In 1833, C. L. Gloger published The Variation of Birds Under the Influence of Climate in which he described geographic variations, but did not recognize that geographic isolation was an indicator of past speciation events. Another naturalist in 1856, Wollaston, studied island beetles in comparison to mainland species. He saw isolation as key to their differentiation. However, he did not recognize that the pattern was due to speciation. One naturalist, Leopold von Buch (1825) did recognize the geographic patterns and explicitly stated that geographic isolation may lead to species separating into new species. Mayr suggests that Von Buch was likely the first naturalist to truly suggest geographic speciation. Other naturalists, such as Henry Walter Bates (1863), recognized and accepted the patterns as evidence of speciation, but in Bate's case, did not propose a coherent model.

In 1868, Moritz Wagner was the first to propose the concept of geographic speciation in which he used the term Separationstheorie. Edward Bagnall Poulton, the evolutionary biologist and a strong proponent of the importance of natural selection, highlighted the role of geographic isolation in promoting speciation, in the process coining the term "sympatric speciation" in 1904.

Wagner and other naturalists who studied the geographic distributions of animals, such as Karl Jordan and David Starr Jordan, noticed that closely related species were often geographically isolated from one another (allopatrically distributed) which lead to the advocation of the importance of geographic isolation in the origin of species. Karl Jordan is thought to have recognized the unification of mutation and isolation in the origin of new species — in stark contrast to the prevailing views at the time. David Starr Jordan reiterated Wagner's proposal in 1905, providing a wealth of evidence from nature to support the theory, and asserting that geographic isolation is obvious but had been unfortunately ignored by most geneticists and experimental evolutionary biologists at the time. Joel Asaph Allen suggested the observed pattern of geographic separation of closely related species be called "Jordan's Law" (or Wagner's Law). Despite the contentions, most taxonomists did accept the geographic model of speciation.

Many of the early terms used to describe speciation were outlined by Ernst Mayr. He was the first to encapsulate the then contemporary literature in his 1942 publication Systematics and the Origin of Species, from the Viewpoint of a Zoologist and in his subsequent 1963 publication Animal Species and Evolution. Like Jordan's works, they relied on direct observations of nature, documenting the occurrence of geographic speciation. He described the three modes: geographic, semi-geographic, and non-geographic; which today, are referred to as allopatric, parapatric, and sympatric respectively. Mayr's 1942 publication, influenced heavily by the ideas of Karl Jordan and Poulton, was regarded as the authoritative review of speciation for over 20 years—and is still valuable today.

A major focus of Mayr's works was on the importance of geography in facilitating speciation; with islands often acting as a central theme to many of the speciation concepts put forth. One of which was the concept of peripatric speciation, a variant of allopatric speciation (he has since distinguished the two modes by referring to them as peripatric and dichopatric). This concept arose by an interpretation of Wagner's Separationstheorie as a form of founder effect speciation that focused on small geographically isolated species. This model was later expanded and modified to incorporate sexual selection by Kenneth Y. Kaneshiro in 1976 and 1980.

== Modern evolutionary synthesis ==
Many geneticists at the time did little to bridge the gap between the genetics of natural selection and the origin of reproductive barriers between species. Ronald Fisher proposed a model of speciation in his 1930 publication The Genetical Theory of Natural Selection, where he described disruptive selection acting on sympatric or parapatric populations — with reproductive isolation completed by reinforcement. Other geneticists such as J. B. S. Haldane did not even recognize that species were real, while Sewall Wright ignored the topic, despite accepting allopatric speciation.

The primary contributors to the incorporation of speciation into modern evolutionary synthesis were Ernst Mayr and Theodosius Dobzhansky. Dobzhansky, a geneticist, published Genetics and the Origin of Species in 1937, in which he formulated the genetic framework for how speciation could occur. He recognized that speciation was an unsolved problem in biology at the time, rejecting Darwin's position that new species arose by occupation of new niches — contending that reproductive isolation was instead based on barriers to gene flow. Subsequently, Mayr conducted extensive work on the geography of species, emphasizing the importance of geographic separation and isolation, in which he filled Dobzhansky's gaps concerning the origin of biodiversity (in his 1942 book). Both of their works gave rise, not without controversy, to the modern understanding of speciation; stimulating a wealth of research on the topic. Furthermore, this extended to plants as well as animals with G. Ledyard Stebbins’s book, Variation and Evolution in Plants and the much later, 1981 book, Plant Speciation by Verne Grant.

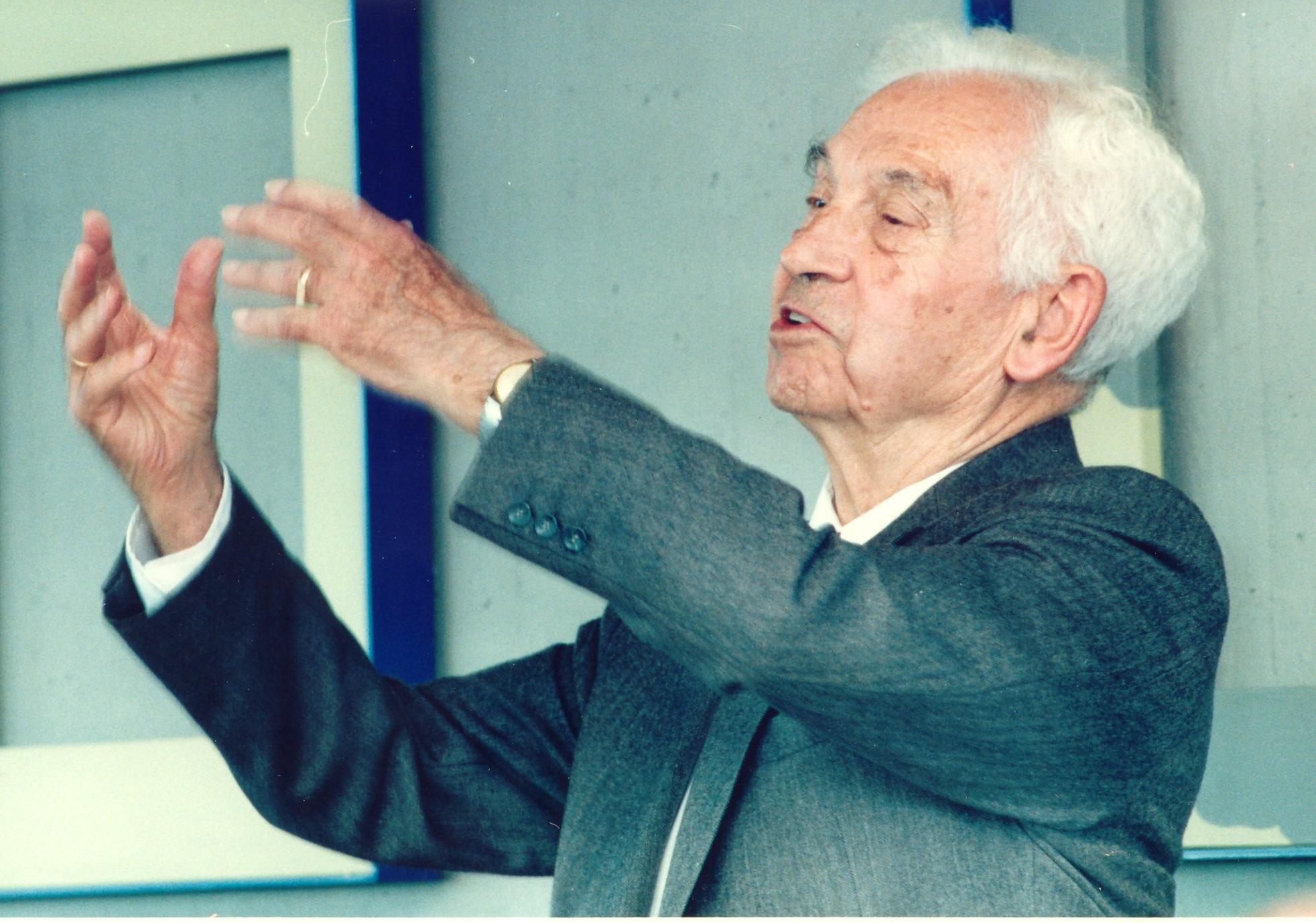
Ernst Mayr, an influential evolutionary biologist

In 1947, "a consensus had been achieved among geneticists, paleontologists and systematists and that evolutionary biology as an independent biological discipline had been established" during a Princeton University conference. This 20th century synthesis incorporated speciation. Since then, the ideas have been consistently and repeatedly confirmed.

== Contemporary work ==
After the synthesis, speciation research continued largely within natural history and biogeography — with much less emphasis on genetics. The study of speciation has seen its largest increase since the 1980s with an influx of publications and a host of new terms, methods, concepts, and theories. This "third phase" of work — as Jerry A. Coyne and H. Allen Orr put it — has led to a growing complexity of the language used to describe the many processes of speciation. The research and literature on speciation have become, "enormous, scattered, and increasingly technical".

From the 1980s, new research tools increased the robustness of research, assisted by new methods, theoretical frameworks, models, and approaches. Coyne and Orr discuss the modern, post-1980s developments centered around five major themes:

1. genetics (also a primary factor in the Modern Synthesis),
2. molecular biology and analysis (namely, phylogenetics and systematics);
3. comparative analysis;
4. mathematical modeling and computer simulations; and
5. the role of ecology.

Ecologists became aware that the ecological factors behind speciation were under-represented. This saw the growth in research concerning ecology's role in facilitating speciation — rightly designated ecological speciation. This focus on ecology generated a host of new terms relating to the barriers to reproduction (e.g. allochronic speciation, in which gene flow is reduced or removed by timing of breeding periods; or habitat isolation, in which species occupy different habitats within the same area). Sympatric speciation, regarded by Mayr as unlikely, has become widely accepted. Research on the influence of natural selection on speciation, including the process of reinforcement, has grown.

Researchers have long debated the roles of sexual selection, natural selection, and genetic drift in speciation. Darwin extensively discussed sexual selection, with his work greatly expanded on by Ronald Fisher; however, it was not until 1983 that the biologist Mary Jane West-Eberhard recognized the importance of sexual selection in speciation. Natural selection plays a role in that any selection towards reproductive isolation can result in speciation — whether indirectly or directly. Genetic drift has been widely researched from the 1950s onwards, especially with peak-shift models of speciation by genetic drift. Mayr championed founder effects, in which isolated individuals, like those found on islands near a mainland, experience a strong population bottleneck, as they contain only a small sample of the genetic variation in the main population. Later, other biologists such as Hampton L. Carson, Alan Templeton, Sergey Gavrilets, and Alan Hastings developed related models of speciation by genetic drift, noting that islands were inhabited mostly by endemic species. Selection's role in speciation is widely supported, whereas founder effect speciation is not, having been subject to a number of criticisms.

=== Classification debate ===
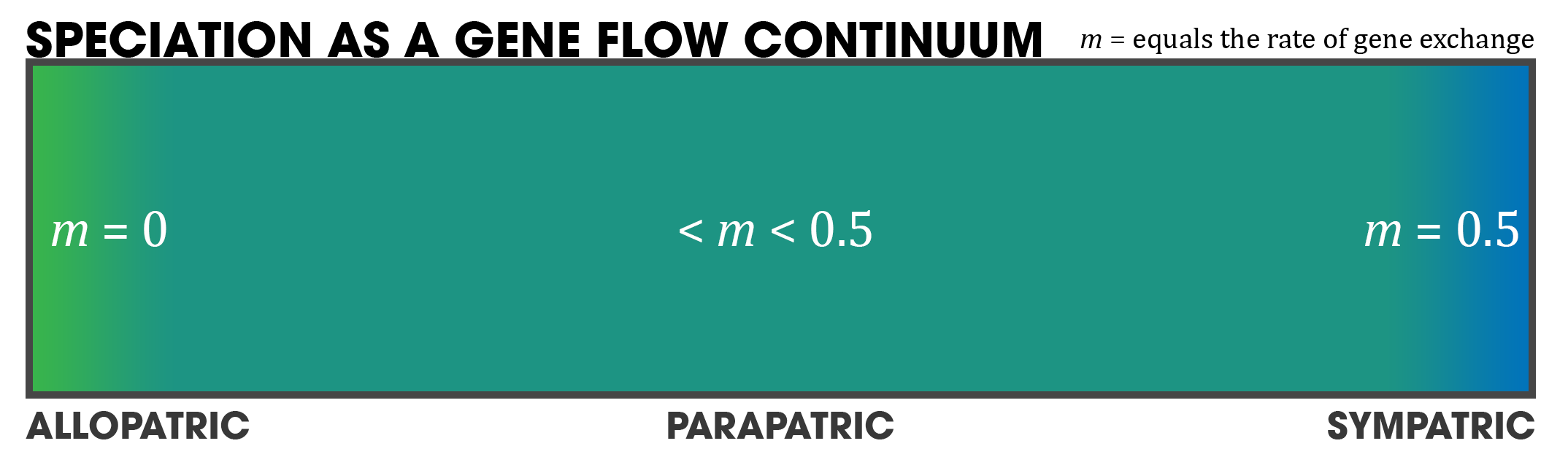
Speciation represented as a continuum of gene flow where $m$ equals the rate of gene exchange. The three primary geographic modes of speciation (allopatric, parapatric, and sympatric) can exist within this continuum, as well as other non-geographic modes.

Throughout the history of research concerning speciation, classification and delineation of modes and processes have been debated. Julian Huxley divided speciation into three separate modes: geographical speciation, genetic speciation, and ecological speciation. Sewall Wright proposed ten different, varying modes. Ernst Mayr championed the importance of physical, geographic separation of species populations, maintaining it to be of major importance to speciation. He originally proposed the three primary modes known today: geographic, semi-geographic, non-geographic; corresponding to allopatric, parapatric, and sympatric respectively.

The phrase "modes of speciation" is imprecisely defined, most often indicating speciation occurring as a result of a species geographic distribution. More succinctly, the modern classification of speciation is often described as occurring on a gene flow continuum (i.e., allopatry at $m=0$ and sympatry at $m=0.5$) This gene flow concept views speciation as based on the exchange of genes between populations instead of seeing a purely geographic setting as necessarily relevant. Despite this, concepts of biogeographic modes can be translated into models of gene flow (such as that in the image at left); however, this translation has led to some confusion of language in the scientific literature.

Comparisons of the three classic geographic modes of speciation: allopatric, parapatric and sympatric; with peripatric speciation included as a special case of allopatric speciation.

As research has expanded over the decades, the geographic scheme has been challenged. The traditional classification is considered by some researchers to be obsolete, while others argue for its merits. Proponents of non-geographic schemes often justify non-geographic classifications, not by rejection of the importance of reproductive isolation (or even the processes themselves), but instead by the fact that it simplifies the complexity of speciation. One major critique of the geographic framework is that it arbitrarily separates a biological continuum into discontinuous groups. Another criticism rests with the fact that, when speciation is viewed as a continuum of gene flow, parapatric speciation becomes unreasonably represented by the entire continuum—with allopatric and sympatric existing in the extremes. Coyne and Orr argue that the geographic classification scheme is valuable in that biogeography controls the strength of the evolutionary forces at play, as gene flow and geography are clearly linked. James Mallet and colleagues contend that the sympatric vs. allopatric dichotomy is valuable to determine the degree in which natural selection acts on speciation. Kirkpatrick and Ravigné categorize speciation in terms of its genetic basis or by the forces driving reproductive isolation. Here, the geographic modes of speciation are classified as types of assortive mating. Fitzpatrick and colleagues believe that the biogeographic scheme "is a distraction that could be positively misleading if the real goal is to understand the influence of natural selection on divergence." They maintain that, to fully understand speciation, "the spatial, ecological, and genetic factors" involved in divergence must be explored. Sara Via recognizes the importance of geography in speciation but suggests that classification under this scheme be abandoned.

== History of modes and mechanisms ==
=== Sympatric speciation ===
Sympatric speciation, from its beginnings with Darwin (who did not coin the term), has been a contentious issue. Mayr, along with many other evolutionary biologists, interpreted Darwins's view of speciation and the origin of biodiversity as arising by species entering new ecological niches—a form of sympatric speciation. Before Mayr, sympatric speciation was regarded as the primary mode of speciation. In 1963, Mayr provided a strong criticism, citing various flaws in the theory. After that, sympatric speciation fell out of favor with biologists and has only recently seen a resurgence in interest. Some biologists, such as James Mallet, believe that Darwin's view on speciation was misunderstood and misconstrued by Mayr. Today, sympatric speciation is supported by evidence from laboratory experiments and observations from nature.

=== Hybrid speciation ===
For most of the history of speciation, hybridization (polyploidy) has been a contentious issue, as botanists and zoologists have traditionally viewed hybridization's role in speciation differently. Carl Linnaeus was the earliest to suggest hybridization in 1760, Øjvind Winge was the first to confirm allopolyploidy in 1917, and a later experiment conducted by Clausen and Goodspeed in 1925 confirmed the findings. Today it is widely recognized as a common mechanism of speciation.

Historically, zoologists considered hybridization to be a rare phenomenon, while botanists found it to be commonplace in plant species. The botanists G. Ledyard Stebbins and Verne Grant were two of the well known botanists who championed the idea of hybrid speciation during the 1950s to the 1980s. Hybrid speciation, also called polyploid speciation (or polyploidy) is speciation that results by an increase in the number of sets of chromosomes. It is effectively a form of sympatric speciation that happens instantly. Grant coined the term recombinational speciation in 1981; a special form of hybrid speciation where a new species results from hybridization and is itself, reproductively isolated from both its parents. Recently, biologists have increasingly recognized that hybrid speciation can occur in animals as well.

=== Reinforcement ===
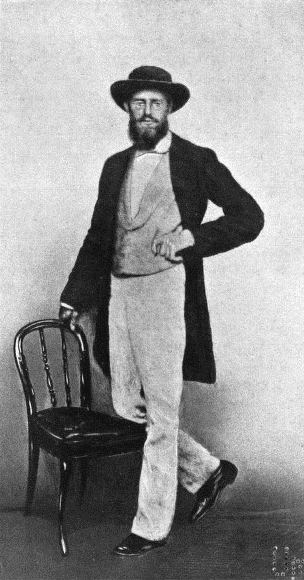
The young naturalist Alfred Russel Wallace in 1862

The concept of speciation by reinforcement has a complex history, with its popularity among scholars changing significantly over time. The theory of reinforcement experienced three phases of historical development:

1. plausibility based on unfit hybrids
2. implausibility based on the finding that hybrids may have some fitness
3. plausibility based on empirical studies and biologically complex and realistic models

It was originally proposed by Alfred Russel Wallace in 1889, termed the Wallace effect—a term rarely used by scientists today. Wallace's hypothesis differed from the modern conception in that it focused on post-zygotic isolation, strengthened by group selection. Dobzhansky was the first to provide a thorough, modern description of the process in 1937, though the actual term itself was not coined until 1955 by W. Frank Blair.

In 1930, Ronald Fisher laid out the first genetic description of the process of reinforcement in The Genetical Theory of Natural Selection, and in 1965 and 1970 the first computer simulations were run to test for its plausibility. Later, population genetic and quantitative genetic studies were conducted showing that completely unfit hybrids lead to an increase in pre-zygotic isolation. After Dobzhansky's idea rose to the forefront of speciation research, it garnered significant support—with Dobzhansky suggesting that it illustrated the final step in speciation (e.g. after an allopatric population comes into secondary contact). In the 1980s, many evolutionary biologists began to doubt the plausibility of the idea, based not on empirical evidence, but largely on the growth of theory that deemed it an unlikely mechanism of reproductive isolation. A number of theoretical objections arose at the time. Since the early 1990s, reinforcement has seen a revival in popularity, with perceptions by evolutionary biologists accepting its plausibility—due primarily from a sudden increase in data, empirical evidence from laboratory studies and nature, complex computer simulations, and theoretical work.

The scientific language concerning reinforcement has also differed over time, with different researchers applying various definitions to the term. First used to describe the observed mating call differences in Gastrophryne frogs within a secondary contact hybrid zone, reinforcement has also been used to describe geographically separated populations that experience secondary contact. Roger Butlin demarcated incomplete post-zygotic isolation from complete isolation, referring to incomplete isolation as reinforcement and completely isolated populations as experiencing reproductive character displacement. Daniel J. Howard considered reproductive character displacement to represent either assortive mating or the divergence of traits for mate recognition (specifically between sympatric populations). Under this definition, it includes pre-zygotic divergence and complete post-zygotic isolation. Maria R. Servedio and Mohamed Noor consider any detected increase in pre-zygotic isolation as reinforcement, as long as it is a response to selection against mating between two different species. Coyne and Orr contend that, "true reinforcement is restricted to cases in which isolation is enhanced between taxa that can still exchange genes".

== See also ==
- Laboratory experiments of speciation
