= Variation and Evolution in Plants =

1950 book by American botanist G. Ledyard Stebbins

- First edition
- Author: G. Ledyard Stebbins
- Genre: Non-fiction
- Publisher: Columbia University Press
- Publication date: 1950

Variation and Evolution in Plants is a book written by G. Ledyard Stebbins, published in 1950. It is one of the key publications embodying the modern synthesis of evolution and genetics, as the first comprehensive publication to discuss the relationship between genetics and natural selection in plants. The book has been described by plant systematist Peter H. Raven as "the most important book on plant evolution of the 20th century" and it remains one of the most cited texts on plant evolution.

== Origin ==
The book is based on the Jesup Lectures that Stebbins delivered at Columbia University in October and November 1946 and is a synthesis of his ideas and the then current research on the evolution of seed plants in terms of genetics.

== Contents ==
The book is written in fourteen parts:

1. Description and analysis of variation patterns
2. Examples of variation patterns within species and genera
3. The basis of individual variation
4. Natural selection and variation in populations
5. Genetic systems as factors in evolution
6. Isolation and the origin of species
7. Hybridization and its effects
8. Polyploidy I: occurrence and nature of polyploid types
9. Polyploidy II: geographic distribution and significance of polyploidy
10. Apomixis in relation to variation and evolution
11. Structural hybridity and the genetic system
12. Evolutionary trends I: the karyotype
13. Evolutionary trends II: External morphology
14. Fossils, modern distribution patterns and rates of evolution

== Significance ==
The 643-page book cites more than 1,250 references and was the longest of the four books associated with the modern evolutionary synthesis. The other key works of the modern synthesis, whose publication also followed their authors' Jesup lectures, are Theodosius Dobzhansky's Genetics and the Origin of Species, Ernst Mayr's Systematics and the Origin of Species and George Gaylord Simpson's Tempo and Mode in Evolution. The great significance of Variation and Evolution in Plants is that it effectively killed any serious belief in alternative mechanisms of evolution for plants, such as Lamarckian evolution or soft inheritance, which were still upheld by some botanists.

== Legacy ==
Stebbins book Flowering Plants: Evolution Above the Species Level was published in 1974 and was based on the Prather Lectures which he gave at Harvard. It is considered as an update to Variation and Evolution.

In January 2000 a colloquium was held in Irvine, California, to celebrate the fiftieth anniversary of the publication of Variation and Evolution in Plants. A 16 chapter book entitled Variation and evolution in Plants and Microorganisms: Toward a New Synthesis 50 Years After Stebbins (ISBN 0-309-07099-6) was released to mark the occasion.
