= Genetics and the Origin of Species =

1937 book by Theodosius Dobzhansky

- Cover of the first (1937) edition
- Author: Theodosius Dobzhansky
- Series: Columbia University Biological Series (volume 11)
- Subject: Evolutionary biology
- Published: Columbia University Press
- Pages: 364
- OCLC: 766405
- LC Class: QH366 .D6

Genetics and the Origin of Species is a 1937 book by the Ukrainian-American evolutionary biologist Theodosius Dobzhansky. It is regarded as one of the most important works of modern synthesis and was one of the earliest. The book popularized the work of population genetics to other biologists and influenced their appreciation for the genetic basis of evolution.

In his book Dobzhansky applied the theoretical work of Sewall Wright (1889–1988) to the study of natural populations. Dobzhansky uses theories of mutation, natural selection, and speciation to explain the habits of populations and the resulting effects on their genetic behavior. The book said evolution was a process that accounts for the diversity of all life on Earth. Dobzhansky said that evolution regarding the origin and nature of species, which at the time was deemed mysterious, had potential for progress.

== Background ==
In Darwin's theory of natural selection, more organisms are produced than can survive. Some have variations that give them a competitive advantage, and they have the best chance of surviving and procreating. The main element lacking in the theory was any mechanism that would allow organisms to pass on these favorable variations. Lacking such a mechanism, the theory of evolution faced competition from theories such as neo-Lamarckism, in which the environment acted directly on organisms, changing their structures. Darwin did not know that the monk Gregor Mendel was already working on experiments that would explain inheritance in terms of units of heredity that we now call genes.

When Mendelian genetics was rediscovered by several scientists, it initially increased the confusion. The Dutch botanist Hugo de Vries developed a theory called mutationism in which most variations were inconsequential and could not lead to species change. Instead, new species were formed by large mutations. At first, geneticists tended to support mutationism; but in the 1920s and 1930s a group of theoretical geneticists – particularly Ronald Fisher, J. B. S. Haldane and Sewall Wright – showed that Mendel's laws could explain continuous variation in biological characteristics; and that natural selection could act cumulatively, giving rise to large changes. Their work provided a theoretical framework for incorporating genetics into the theory of evolution.

Many biologists fell into two camps: the geneticists, who mostly worked in the laboratory; and naturalists, who studied natural populations in the field and museums, and put much of their effort into taxonomy. Each contributed concepts that were essential to the understanding of evolution. Naturalists introduced the biological species concept, the definition of species as a community that is reproductively isolated and occupies a distinctive ecological niche. They also recognized that species are polytypic, having variations in time and space; and that behavior and change of function can give rise to evolutionary change.

The two groups used such different methods and terminology that it was difficult for them to communicate. They were often battling over the same scarce academic resources, and each was often scornful of the other. As the paleontologist George Gaylord Simpson put it, paleontologists believed that "a geneticist was a person who shut himself in a room, pulled down the shades, watched small flies disporting themselves in milk bottles, and thought that he was studying nature." Meanwhile, naturalists were "like a man who undertakes to study the principles of the internal combustion engine by standing on a street corner and watching the motor cars whiz by."

== Publication ==
The book began as a series of lectures at Columbia University in October and November 1936. Dobzhansky decided to attend the summer 1936 meeting of the Genetics Society of America in Woods Hole, Massachusetts. When the geneticist Leslie Dunn learned of this, he invited Dobzhansky to give a series of lectures at Columbia. He sent the invitation in April, and within a month he had suggested that the lectures be a springboard for writing a general treatise on evolutionary genetics. Dobzhansky was enthusiastic, and in May he wrote back, proposing the title "Genetics and the Origin of Species". He envisioned two parts – "part I containing data on the sources of evolutionary change, and part II containing a discussion of their interactions leading to race- and species formation." After the lectures (for which he received $500), Dobzhansky returned to Pasadena, and in December Columbia University Press accepted his proposal for a book. The pace of writing was helped by a riding accident in February 1937 in which he crushed his knee, rendering him immobile; and by April he was able to send a manuscript to Dunn for his perusal.

While reading the manuscript, Dunn persuaded the university to revive the Jesup lectures, a series that had involved some notable lecturers in the past. It was back-dated so that Dobzhansky's lectures became the first in the series. The Columbia University Biological Series was also revived, and when Genetics and the Origin of Species was published in October 1937 it became the 11th volume in that series.

Three main editions were published, in 1937, 1941 and 1951, each with significant changes. Dobzhansky considered Genetics of the Evolutionary Process (1970) a fourth edition, but one so much changed that it needed a new title.

== Contents of the first edition ==
Genetics and the Origin of Species has two main points to make. The first is that speciation is a genuine problem that must be explained by the theory of evolution. In nature, there is not a single population of organisms separated from each other by small variations. Instead, the natural world is divided into species, each with its own limited range of variability. The second point is that all the variations can be explained by the principles of genetics.

The 1937 edition was divided into nine chapters, whose contents are described below.

=== Organic diversity ===
The first chapter is a short outline of the main points of the book: Evolutionary theory must account for variations on the level of the individual and also that of populations and species. It must explain how reproductive isolation can occur. And the goal is to explain all this using genetic principles that can be verified in the laboratory.

=== Gene mutation ===
The second chapter argues that mutations occur frequently and are random in direction. Most are small in effect, but they affect all features of organisms and vary from beneficial to lethal. They are sufficient to provide the raw material for natural selection.

=== Mutation as a basis for racial and specific differences ===
In the third chapter, Dobzhansky demonstrates that the mutations that are observed in the laboratory also occur in nature, where they are acted on by natural selection. Thus, there is nothing intrinsically different about the process by which new species evolve.

=== Chromosomal changes ===
Dobzhansky continues the theme of continuity between the laboratory and nature in chapter 4, showing that variations in the structure, arrangement and number of chromosomes occur in both the laboratory and nature. He shows that chromosomal translocation, a rearrangement of parts in chromosomes, accounts for racial differences in Datura stramonium (jimson-weed). Chromosomal inversion, a reversal of a segment, is the basis for differentiation in Drosophila. He also points out that these effects demonstrate that the chromosome parts are interdependent.

=== Variation in natural populations ===
Having established that the sources of natural variation are mutations and chromosomal rearrangements, Dobzhansky considers what shapes and preserves this variation. In the first edition of this book, he considers genetic drift as important as natural selection. As an example, he argued that drift was the reason for racial variations that were observed in Partula, a land snail, so these variations had no adaptive advantage. He argued that most such variations, which he called microgeographic race, was nonadaptive. Because variation is not always controlled by selection, we need to know the size of a population before we can predict its evolutionary dynamics.

=== Selection ===
The sixth chapter discusses the evidence for natural selection from experiments in the laboratory and observations of nature. He considered examples of camouflage such as industrial melanism, in which moths and other arthropods evolve darker pigmentation when exposed to an environment with a lot of soot in it. He refuted some Mendelian misconceptions about the effectiveness of natural selection, but he also rejected the strict selectionism of Fisher.

=== Polyploidy ===
In the seventh chapter, Dobzhansky discusses polyploidy, a condition (common in plants) where an organism has more than two complete sets of chromosomes. (Humans are diploid, having one set each from the mother and father.) He discusses case histories such as that of Raphanobrassica, a hybrid between the radish and the cabbage. This is an example of "cataclysmic" speciation, an exception to his general rule that speciation is a slow process.

=== Isolating mechanisms ===
An isolating mechanism prevents members of two different species from successfully producing offspring. Dobzhansky invented the term, and in the eighth chapter he discusses their role in speciation. His views were sufficiently original for him to publish them in a journal article as well. Although previous authors had recognized the importance of isolation, their reasons were entirely different from his. George Romanes thought that isolation was a cause of change, whereas Dobzhansky sees two competing effects. Isolation reduces the rate of formation of harmful gene combinations, but it also restricts the scope of genetic variation. Thus, a species remains near a given peak in the fitness landscape and does not find new adaptive peaks.

Dobzhansky presents a classification of isolating mechanisms. The main division is between hybrid sterility, which he discusses in the next chapter, and mechanisms that prevent organisms from mating. These include geographic and ecological isolation. After two populations are changed sufficiently, "physiological" isolating mechanisms prevent them from mating, so they will remain distinct even if they are no longer physically isolated. This isolation is the end of a continuous process that includes division into races, and involves multiple mutations.

=== Hybrid sterility ===
In the chapter on isolating mechanisms, Dobzhansky deplores the "appallingly insufficient attention" that geneticists had devoted to isolation. The only isolating mechanism that they had studied was sterility in hybrid organisms, so he devotes the ninth chapter to a particularly detailed analysis of the literature on this subject.

== Experiments ==
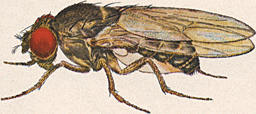
Male Drosophila pseudoobscura

Through his work on Drosophila pseudoobscura, a species of fruitfly, Dobzhansky was able to identify that some populations of this species did not have identical sets of genes. Dobzhansky used experimental breeding in laboratories and gardens, and also surveys related to species in nature to help support aspects of organic evolution. The data in his book show the different genetic mutations and chromosomal changes that were observed. These experiments are vital to this book because they illustrate a transition from the laboratory to the greater field of genetics. Drosophila enabled researchers to gain a deeper understanding of how scientific knowledge about heredity has expanded and contributed to other areas of biology. By focusing on the opportunities and constraints of the research organism, persuasive accounts of the chromosomal genetics of Drosophila eventually evolved into the genetics of natural populations in the 1930s. All of the results from his experiments support the theory of modern evolutionary synthesis.

=== Mutations ===
Through his experiments, Dobzhansky discovers that mutation of genes leads to evolution within a specific species. Adaptations play a large role in genetic drift, and it is known that genes and mutations influence this genetic drift in a particular environment. Mutations can result from external influences within the surrounding environment, especially if an organism inhabits an area with harsh living conditions. An organism can adapt to its environment in order to better suit its own needs. When an organism successfully adapts, it has higher survival and reproduction rates. Therefore, there is a higher chance that its genes will be passed on to its offspring. Specific genes and alleles are then passed on to future generations to continue the trend of modern evolution that Dobzhansky presents in the book.

Dobzhansky said that natural mutation, aided by variation, can lead to change when acted upon by natural selection. Mutations were thought to be relatively rare and other variations were even considered to be harmful. Since an organism's overall genetic make-up was the result of natural selection, with damaging mutations weeded out, wild populations were assumed to have very few mutations. As a result, evolution was said to be a relatively slow process. One of Dobzhansky's major contributions in this book was to show that this view of slow-moving evolution was incorrect. While analyzing chromosome structure in wild populations of Drosophila pseudoobscura, Dobzhansky discovered a surprising amount of undiscovered variability. These variations could not be observed in the outward appearance of the individual organisms. Dobzhansky suggested that the preservation of extensive variation would allow populations to evolve rapidly as environmental conditions change. This book was a landmark in the evolutionary synthesis, as it presented the union of Mendelian genetics and Darwinian theory.

In Genetics and the Origin of Species, polyploidy is considered as a type of mutation. Polyploid cells have a chromosome number that is more than twice the haploid number. The effects of polyploidy between two different species causes hybridization and even greater evolution.

=== Natural selection and speciation ===
Natural selection in an environment produces reproductive success, which benefits the species. Speciation is a process of evolution through which new biological species are formed. Dobzhansky studied the specifics of sexual, physiological, and behavioral isolating mechanisms in Drosophila pseudoobscura and Drosophila paulistrorum. Like many of his other studies, Dobzhansky's work on reproductive isolation was aimed at studying the process of evolution in action. Bringing samples from each population back into the laboratory, Dobzhansky showed that he could vary environmental conditions so as to produce the same changes in frequency of inversion patterns that were observed with changing seasons in the field. Dobzhansky concluded that such seasonal fluctuations were the result of natural selection at work, with temperature acting as the selecting agent. These masterful studies provided concrete support for the theory of natural selection, at the same time illustrating the fruitfulness of combining field and laboratory work in the study of evolution. Adaptive evolution occurs through the dominance and survival of competing genes within a species. This is caused by increasing the frequency of those alleles whose phenotypic effects selfishly promote their own reproduction. He also believed new species could not arise from single mutations and must be isolated from others of its species by time, geography, habitat, or breeding season.

== Historical impact ==
Genetics and the Origin of Species provided the outline for a synthesis of genetics with evolution, and was enthusiastically received by both geneticists and naturalists. Dobzhansky laid out an advanced account of the evolutionary process in genetic terms, and he backed up his work with experimental evidence supporting the theoretical arguments. This led to the stimulation of the field of evolutionary genetics, and contributions to the theory soon began to follow. This had a powerful impact on naturalists and experimental biologists, who quickly embraced this new understanding of the evolutionary process as one of genetic change in populations. It was not long before the synthesis was broadened to include paleontology, systematics and botany in a series of notable books: Systematics and the Origin of Species (1942) by Ernst Mayr; Tempo and Mode in Evolution (1944) by George Gaylord Simpson; and Variation and Evolution in Plants (1950) by G. Ledyard Stebbins. The emerging synthesis was called the evolutionary synthesis by Julian Huxley in his book, Evolution: The Modern Synthesis. In 1947, a diverse collection of biologists met at a symposium in Princeton and declared their acceptance of this synthesis. However, it was not yet complete. Developmental biologists did not accept that the theory explained their observations, and it was not until the 1970s and 1980s that molecular biology bridged the gap. Also, for decades there was disagreement over whether the unit of selection was the gene or the individual as a whole.

In 1974 all the living founders of the modern synthesis (with the exception of Simpson and Bernhard Rensch) met with historians of biology in a conference to evaluate their work. All acknowledged Genetics and the Origin of Species as the direct instigator of all the work that followed. Ernst Mayr, in The Growth of Biological Thought, said that it was "clearly the most decisive event in the history of evolutionary biology since the publication of the Origin of Species in 1859.

== Awards ==
Dobzhansky was plagued by a form of leukemia in his later years, but he remained vigorously active until the day before his death on December 18, 1975. During his lifetime he was the recipient of many honors and awards. For Genetics and the Origin of Species Dobzhansky was awarded the Daniel Giraud Elliot Medal from the National Academy of Sciences in 1941. Sixty years after its publication, the National Academy of Sciences commissioned a book entitled Genetics and the Origin of Species: From Darwin to Molecular Biology 60 Years After Dobzhansky.

It was also included in the 1990 edition of Great Books of the Western World, placing it with Charles Darwin's two great works The Origin of Species and The Descent of Man. A third edition was published in 1951.
