= G. Ledyard Stebbins =

American botanist and geneticist (1906-2000)

G. Ledyard Stebbins ForMemRS
- Born: George Ledyard Stebbins Jr. January 6, 1906; Lawrence, New York
- Died: January 19, 2000 (aged 94); Davis, California
- Education: Cate School, Carpinteria, California; Harvard University (Ph.D. 1931); UC Berkeley
- Known for: Variation and Evolution in Plants
- Awards: Linnean Medal (1973); National Medal of Science (1979); Leidy Award (1983)
- Scientific career
- Workplaces: UC Davis
- Academic advisors: Merritt Lyndon Fernald, E. C. Jeffrey, Karl Sax
- Author abbrev. (botany): Stebbins

George Ledyard Stebbins Jr. (January 6, 1906 – January 19, 2000) was an American botanist and geneticist who is widely regarded as one of the leading evolutionary biologists of the 20th century. Stebbins received his Ph.D. in botany from Harvard University in 1931. He went on to the University of California, Berkeley, where his work with E. B. Babcock on the genetic evolution of plant species, and his association with a group of evolutionary biologists known as the Bay Area Biosystematists, led him to develop a comprehensive synthesis of plant evolution incorporating genetics.

His most important publication was Variation and Evolution in Plants, which combined genetics and Darwin's theory of natural selection to describe plant speciation. It is regarded as one of the main publications which formed the core of the modern synthesis and still provides the conceptual framework for research in plant evolutionary biology; according to Ernst Mayr, "Few later works dealing with the evolutionary systematics of plants have not been very deeply affected by Stebbins' work." He also researched and wrote widely on the role of hybridization and polyploidy in speciation and plant evolution; his work in this area has had a lasting influence on research in the field.

From 1960, Stebbins was instrumental in the establishment of the Department of Genetics at the University of California, Davis, and was active in numerous organizations involved in the promotion of evolution, and of science in general. He was elected to the National Academy of Sciences and the American Philosophical Society, was awarded the National Medal of Science, and was involved in the development of evolution-based science programs for California high schools, as well as the conservation of rare plants in that state.

== Early life and education ==
Stebbins was born in Lawrence, New York, the youngest of three children. His parents were George Ledyard Stebbins, a wealthy real estate financier who developed Seal Harbor, Maine and helped to establish Acadia National Park, and Edith Alden Candler Stebbins; both parents were native New Yorkers and Episcopalians. Stebbins was known throughout his life as Ledyard, to distinguish himself from his father. The family encouraged their sons' interest in natural history during their periodic journeys to Seal Harbor. In 1914, Edith contracted tuberculosis and the Stebbins moved to Santa Barbara, California to improve her health. In California, Stebbins was enrolled at the Cate School in Carpinteria where he became influenced by Ralph Hoffmann, an American natural history instructor and amateur ornithologist and botanist. After graduating from high school, he embarked on a major in political studies at Harvard. By the third year of his undergraduate study, he had decided to major in botany.

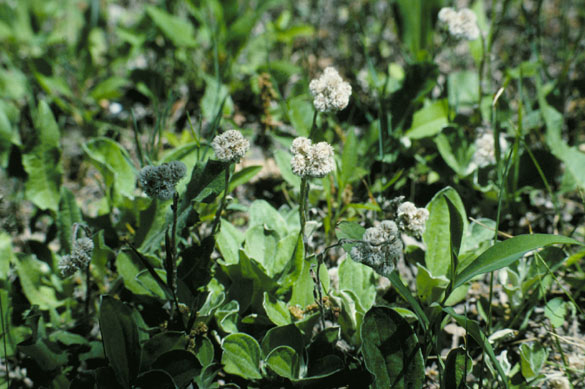
The perennial plant Antennaria plantaginifolia is one of the species studied by Stebbins for his doctoral dissertation.

Stebbins started graduate studies at Harvard in 1928, initially working on flowering plant taxonomy and biogeography—particularly that of the flora of New England—with Merritt Lyndon Fernald. He completed his MA in 1929 in biological sciences and continued to work toward his Ph.D. He became interested in using chromosomes for taxonomic studies, a method that Fernald did not support. Stebbins chose to concentrate his doctoral work on the cytology of plant reproductive processes in the genus Antennaria, with cytologist E. C. Jeffrey as his supervisor and Fernald on his supervisory panel. During his Ph.D. candidature, Stebbins sought advice and supervision from geneticist Karl Sax. Sax identified several errors in Stebbins's work and disapproved of his interpretation of results that, while in accordance with Jeffrey's views, were inconsistent with the work of contemporary geneticists. Jeffrey and Sax argued over Stebbins's dissertation, and the thesis was revised numerous times to accommodate their differing views.

Stebbins's Ph.D. was granted by Harvard in 1931. In March that year, he married Margaret Chamberlin, with whom he had three children. In 1932, he took a teaching position in biology at Colgate University. While at Colgate, he continued his work in cytogenetics; in particular, he continued to study the genetics of Antennaria and began to study the behaviour of chromosomes in hybrid peonies bred by biologist Percy Saunders. Saunders and Stebbins attended the 1932 International Congress of Genetics in Ithaca, New York. Here, Stebbins's interest was captured by talks given by Thomas Hunt Morgan and Barbara McClintock, who spoke about chromosomal crossover. Stebbins reproduced McClintock's crossover experiments in the peony, and published several papers on the cytogenetics of Paeonia, which established his reputation as a geneticist.

== UC Berkeley ==
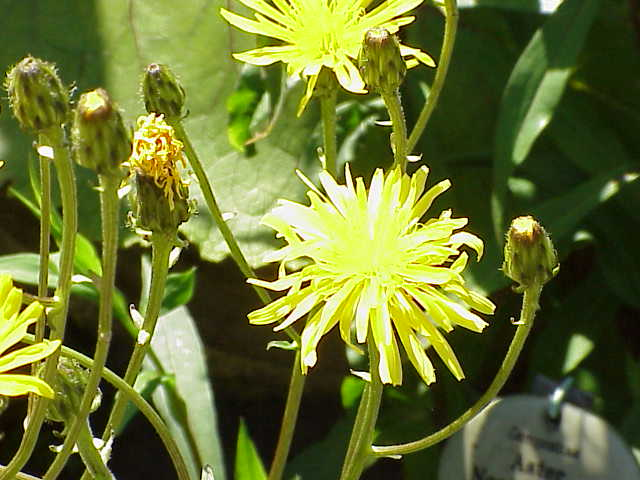
Polyploidy and speciation in the genus Crepis was the subject of Stebbins's and Babcock's work on plant species formation. C. sibirica, shown here, was a species he examined.

In 1935, Stebbins was offered a genetics research position at the University of California, Berkeley working with geneticist E. B. Babcock. Babcock needed assistance with a large Rockefeller-funded project characterizing the genetics and evolutionary processes of plants from the genus Crepis and was interested in developing Crepis into a model plant, to enable genetic investigations similar to those possible in the model insect Drosophila melanogaster. Like the genera that Stebbins had previously studied, Crepis commonly hybridized, displayed polyploidy (chromosome doubling), and could make seed without fertilization (a process known as apomixis). The collaboration between Babcock and Stebbins produced numerous papers and two monographs. The first monograph, published in 1937, resulted in splitting off the Asiatic Crepis species into the genus Youngia. The second, published in 1938, was titled The American Species of Crepis: their interrelationships and distribution as affected by polyploidy and apomixis.

In The American Species of Crepis, Babcock and Stebbins described the concept of the polyploid complex, and its role in plant evolution. Some genera, such as Crepis, have a complex of reproductive forms that center on sexually diploid populations that have also given rise to polyploid ones. Babcock and Stebbins also observed that allopolyploid types formed from the hybridization of two different species always have a wider distribution than diploid or autotetraploid species, and proposed that polyploids formed through hybridization have a greater potential to exploit varied environments, because they inherit all traits from both parents. They also showed that hybridization in the polyploid complex could provide a mechanism for genetic exchange between diploid species that were otherwise unable to breed. Their observations offered insight into species formation and knowledge of how all these complex processes could provide information on the history of a genus. This monograph was described by Swedish botanist Åke Gustafsson as the most important work on the formation of species during that period.

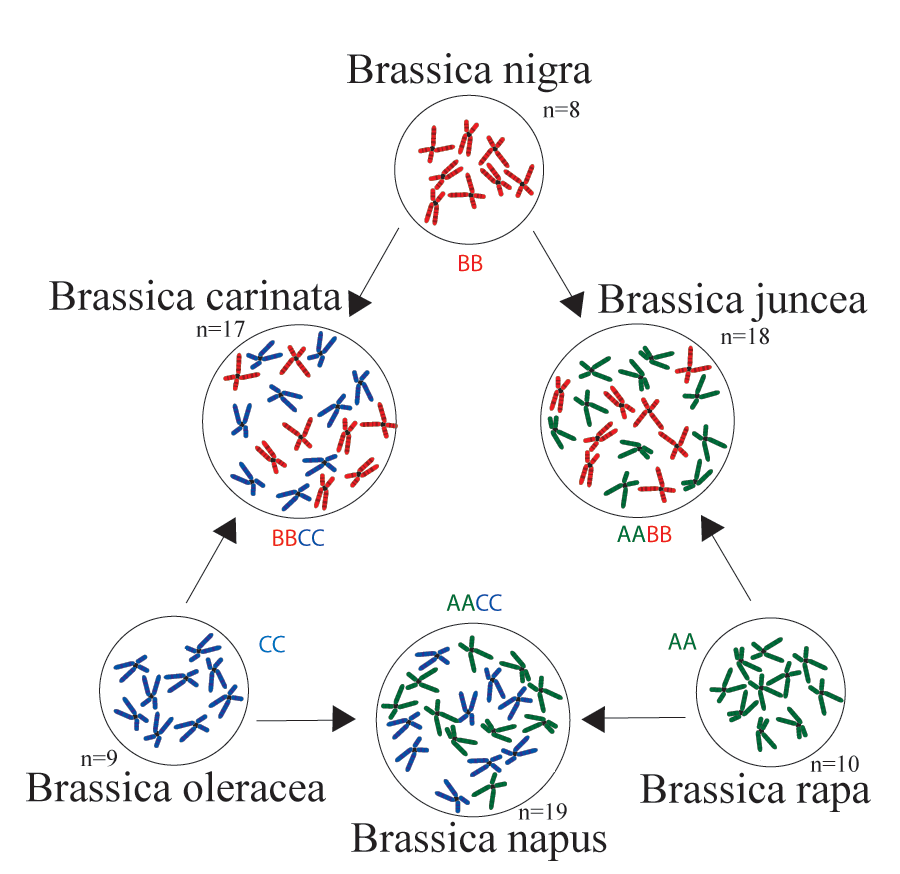
The Triangle of U shows how hybridization, and polyploidy have given rise to new species in the genus Brassica. Chromosomes from each of the genomes A, B and C are represented by different colours. The cartoon shows the origin of the AABB, AACC and BBCC species which have chromosome sets from their AA, BB and CC ancestors.

Stebbins's review, "The significance of polyploidy in plant evolution", published in American Naturalist in 1940, demonstrated how work done on artificial polyploids and natural polyploid complexes had shown that polyploidy was important in developing large, complex, and widespread genera. However, by looking at the history of polyploidy in plant families, he argued that polyploidy was only common in herbaceous perennials and infrequent in woody plants and annuals. As such, polyploids played a conservative role in evolution since problems with fertility prevented the acquisition and replication of new genetic material that might lead to a new line of evolution. This work continued with the 1947 paper "Types of polyploids: their classification and significance", which detailed a system for the classification of polyploids and described Stebbins's ideas about the role of paleopolyploidy in angiosperm evolution, where he argued that chromosome number may be a useful tool for the construction of phylogenies. These reviews were highly influential and provided a basis for others to study the role of polyploidy in evolution.

In 1939, with Babcock's support, Stebbins was made a full professor in the Department of Genetics at UC Berkeley, after the Department of Botany failed to promote him. Stebbins was required to teach a course on evolution, and during his preparation he became excited by contemporary research combining genetics and evolution. He became associated with a group known as the Bay Area Biosystematists, which included botanist Jens Clausen, taxonomist David D. Keck, physiologist William Hiesey and the evolutionary geneticist Theodosius Dobzhansky. During this time he also became friends with the botanist Herbert Baker. With the encouragement of this group of scientists, Stebbins directed his research towards evolution. He became involved with the Society for the Study of Evolution in 1946, and was one of the few botanists involved with the new organization.

His research on plant evolution also progressed during this period; he worked on the genetics of forage grasses, looking at polyploidy and the evolution of the Poaceae and publishing numerous papers on the subject though the 1940s. He produced an artificial autotetraploid grass from the diploid species Ehrharta erecta through treatment with the chromosome doubling agent colchicine. He was able to establish the plant in the field, and after 39 years of field trials was able to show that the autopolyploid was not as successful as its diploid parent in an unchanging environment.

== Variation and Evolution in Plants ==
Columbia University's Jesup Lectures were the starting point for many of the most important works of the modern evolutionary synthesis. The presenters introduced the connection between two important discoveries—the units of evolution (genes) with selection as the primary mechanism of evolution. In 1941, Edgar Anderson (whose work on hybridization in the genus Iris had interested Stebbins since they met in 1930) and Ernst Mayr co-presented the lecture series and Mayr later published his lectures as Systematics and the Origin of Species. In 1946, Stebbins was invited on Dobzhansky's recommendation to present the prestigious lectures. Stebbins's lectures drew together the otherwise disparate fields of genetics, ecology, systematics, cytology, and paleontology. In 1950, these lectures were published as Variation and Evolution in Plants, which proved to be one of the most important books in 20th-century botany. The book brought botanical science into the new synthesis of evolutionary theory, and became part of the canon of biological works written between 1936 and 1950 that formed the modern synthesis of evolution.

Variation and Evolution in Plants was the first book to provide a wide-ranging explanation of how evolutionary mechanisms operated in plants at the genetic level. It brought concepts related to plant evolution into line with animal evolution as it emerged from Dobzhansky's 1937 Genetics and the Origin of Species and provided the conceptual framework to organize a disparate set of disciplines into a new field: plant evolutionary biology. In the book Stebbins argued that evolution needed to be studied as a dynamic problem and that evolution must be considered on three levels: first, that of individual variation within an interbreeding population; second, that of the distribution and frequency of this variation; and third, that of the separation and divergence of populations as the result of the building up of isolating mechanisms leading to the formation of species. He used the work of biosystematists Clausen, Keck, Hiesey, and Turesson to show that it was possible to distinguish between genotypic and phenotypic variation—that is, genetically identical plants could have different phenotypes in different environments. One of the book's most original chapters used the cytogenetics work of C. D. Darlington to show that genetic systems like hybridization and polyploidy were also subject to selection.

The book offered few original hypotheses, but Stebbins hoped that by summarising the available research on plant evolution the book would "help to open the way towards a deeper understanding of evolutionary problems and more fruitful research in the direction of their solution." The book effectively ended any serious belief in alternative mechanisms of evolution in plants, such as Lamarckian evolution or soft inheritance, which were still upheld by some botanists. Following that publication, Stebbins was regarded as an expert on modern evolutionary theory and is widely credited with the founding of the science of plant evolutionary biology. Variation and Evolution in Plants continues to be widely cited in contemporary scientific botanical literature more than 50 years after its publication.

Stebbins regarded his contribution to the modern synthesis as the application of genetic principles already established by other workers to botany. "I didn't add any new elements [to the modern synthetic theory] to speak of. I just modified things so that people could understand how things were in the plant world."

== UC Davis and later life ==
Stebbins took an appointment at the University of California, Davis in 1950, where he was a key figure in the establishment of the university's department of genetics; he was the department's first chairman and held the position from 1958 to 1963. At Davis, the focus of his research changed to incorporate newer areas, such as developmental morphology and genetics in crop plants, including barley. He continued to publish widely and extensively on plant evolution, writing over 200 papers and several books after 1950.

Stebbins and Edgar Anderson wrote a paper in 1954 on the importance of hybridization in adapting to new environments. They proposed novel adaptations would facilitate the invasion of habitats not utilized previously by either parent and that novel adaptations may facilitate the formation of stabilized hybrid species. Following this paper, Stebbins developed the first model of adaptive radiation. He proposed that a high degree of genetic variability was necessary for major evolutionary advances, that because of slow mutation rates, genetic recombination was the most likely source of this variation, and that variation could be maximised though hybridization. As of 2006, research is ongoing regarding whether hybridization is an accidental consequence of evolution or if it is necessary for the creation and evolution of plant species; it has been argued that contemporary studies are part of an intellectual lineage that started with the work of Stebbins and Anderson.

Stebbins wrote several books during his time at UC Davis. These included his follow-up to Variation and Evolution, Flowering Plants: Evolution Above the Species Level, which was published in 1974, following his delivery of the Prather Lectures at Harvard. Stebbins discusses the origins, genetics and developmental biology of the angiosperms. He argues for the role of adaptive radiation in the diversification of the angiosperms and the usefulness of applying our current understanding of species' genetics and ecology to gain knowledge about the evolution of ancient species. He also wrote Processes of Organic Evolution, The Basis of Progressive Evolution, Chromosomal Evolution in Plants and the textbook Evolution with co-authors Dobzhansky, Francisco Ayala and James W. Valentine. His last book, Darwin to DNA, Molecules to Humanity was published in 1982.

Stebbins was passionate about teaching evolution, advocating during the 1960s and 70s the teaching of Darwinian evolution in public schools. He worked closely with the Biological Sciences Curriculum Study to develop high school curricula based on evolution as the central unifying principle in biology. He also opposed scientific creationism groups. Stebbins was active in numerous science organizations—including the International Union of Biological Sciences, the Western Society of Naturalists, the Botanical Society of America, and the Society for the Study of Evolution—and served as President of the American Society of Naturalists. He was elected to the National Academy of Sciences in 1952. Stebbins received numerous awards for his contributions to science: the National Medal of Science, the Gold Medal from the Linnean Society of London, the Addison Emery Verrill Medal from the Yale Peabody Museum of Natural History, and the John Frederick Lewis Award from the American Philosophical Society. He was elected a Fellow of the American Academy of Arts and Sciences in 1952. He was awarded the 1983 Leidy Award from the Academy of Natural Sciences of Philadelphia.

Stebbins was active in conservation issues in California during his later life. He established a California Native Plant Society branch in Sacramento in the early 1960s. Through the society, he created an active field trip program to increase interest in the native flora of California and to document rare plants. Stebbins was the state President of the Society during 1966. The society was instrumental in preventing the destruction of a beach on the Monterey Peninsula that he referred to as "Evolution Hill"—the area is now known as the S.F.B. Morse Botanical Area and is managed by the Del Monte Forest Foundation. He was a major contributor to the Society's 1996 book California's Wild Gardens: A Living Legacy. Stebbins was instrumental in the establishment of the Inventory of Rare and Endangered Vascular Plants of California by the California Native Plant Society; it is still used by state and federal bodies in the United States for conservation policy-making. Stebbins was also a member of the Sierra Club.

During his tenure at UC Davis, he trained more than 30 graduate students in genetics, developmental biology and agricultural science. In 1973, Stebbins gave his last lectures at UC Davis and was made professor emeritus. Following his retirement, he travelled widely, taught, and visited colleagues for the next 20 years. His last paper, "A brief summary of my ideas on evolution", was published in the American Journal of Botany in 1999. The same year he was co-recipient with Ernst Mayr of the Distinguished Service award from the American Institute of Biological Sciences. A colloquium was held by the National Academies of Science in 2000 to commemorate the 50th anniversary of the publication of Variation and Evolution in Plants. Stebbins died in his home in Davis the same year from a cancer-related illness. Stebbins was honored at a Unitarian memorial service—he had been active in the church in his later years following his 1958 marriage to his second wife, Barbara Monaghan Stebbins. His ashes were scattered at Stebbins Cold Canyon Reserve.

== Legacy ==
Stebbins made an enormous contribution to scientific thought and botany by developing an intellectual framework for studying plant evolution including modern concepts of plant species and plant speciation. His contributions to the literature of plant evolutionary biology, in addition to his seven books, include more than 280 journal articles and book chapters, a compilation of which were published in 2004—The Scientific Papers of G. Ledyard Stebbins (1929–2000) (ISBN 3-906166-15-5). Betty Smocovitis, a historian of science who is preparing a book-length biography on Stebbins, described Stebbins's scientific contribution as follows:

In science as in everything, small-scale synthesizers usually get credit from all constituent parties, but truly great synthesizers can fall between the cracks in the cycle of scientific credit. Ledyard Stebbins was in the latter category; neither fish nor fowl, he frequently failed to receive credit for work in some areas, usually at the hands of narrower colleagues. Few, however, have challenged his contributions to plant evolutionary biology, nor questioned his ability to synthesize disparate literature into a coherent framework. His ability to read quickly, recognize novel insights, digest new material, and then integrate the knowledge were the hallmarks of his scientific work style. He was a masterful synthesizer and master of the review essay or synthetic thought piece.

In 1980, the University of California, Davis, named a parcel of land near Lake Berryessa, California, the Stebbins Cold Canyon Reserve in recognition of his contributions to conservation and evolutionary science. The reserve is part of the University of California Natural Reserve System. The UC Davis Herbarium maintains a G. Ledyard Stebbins student grant program, established in celebration of his 90th birthday.

Calystegia stebbinsii, Lomatium stebbinsii, Harmonia stebbinsii, Elymus stebbinsii, Lewisia stebbinsii and others are named in honor of Stebbins.

== Key publications ==
- Variation and Evolution in Plants (1950)
- Processes of Organic Evolution (1966)
- The Basis of Progressive Evolution (1969)
- Chromosomal Evolution in Higher Plants (1971) (ISBN 0-7131-2287-0)
- Flowering plants: evolution above the species level (1974). Cambridge, Mass.: Harvard University Press. 1974. ISBN 978-0-674-30685-1.
- Evolution (1977) with Dobzhansky, Ayala and Valentine
- Darwin to DNA, Molecules to Humanity (1982) (ISBN 0-7167-1331-4)

== Bibliography ==
- Mayr, E. (2002). "G. Ledyard Stebbins" (PDF). Proceedings of the American Philosophical Society. 146: 129–131. Archived from the original (PDF) on 2006-08-23.
- Raven, P. H. (2000). "G. Ledyard Stebbins (1906-2000): An appreciation". Proceedings of the National Academy of Sciences. 97 (13): 6945–6946. Bibcode:2000PNAS...97.6945R. doi:10.1073/pnas.97.13.6945. PMC 34367. PMID 10860954.
- Smocovitis, V. B. (1997). "G. Ledyard Stebbins Jr. and the evolutionary synthesis (1924–1950)". American Journal of Botany. 84 (12): 1625–1637. doi:10.2307/2446460. JSTOR 2446460. PMID 21708566.
- Smocovitis, V. B. (2001). "G. Ledyard Stebbins and the evolutionary Synthesis". Annual Review of Genetics. 35: 803–814. doi:10.1146/annurev.genet.35.102401.091525. PMID 11700300.
- Smocovitis, V. B. 2001. "Stebbins, G. Ledyard". American National Biography Online. Oxford University Press.
- Smocovitis, V. B. and F. J. Ayala. 2004. George Ledyard Stebbins, January 6, 1906–January 19, 2000 Biographical Memoirs, vol. 85, Washington DC: National Academies Press, pp. 1–24.
- Stebbins, G. L. (V. C. Hollowell, V. B. Smocovitis and E. P. Duggan, editors). 2007. The Ladyslipper and I. Monographs in Systematic Botany from the Missouri Botanical Garden. Missouri Botanical Garden, St. Louis [autobiography].
