= Bay Area Biosystematists =

Group of scientists interested in evolution

The Bay Area Biosystematists is a group of biologists, geneticists, paleontologists, and systematists that are also interested in evolution. The group has been active in the San Francisco Bay Area since 1936, and is notable as a connection between many of the leading evolutionary biologists of the 20th century, including Herbert Baker, Theodosius Dobzhansky and G. Ledyard Stebbins who led the modern synthesis. Meetings generally occur the second Tuesday of every month during the academic year at one of the Bay Area campuses (UC Berkeley, UC Davis, the California Academy of Sciences, San Jose State U, etc.).
