= James W. Valentine =

American evolutionary biologist (1926–2023)

- James Valentine in 1991.
- Born: November 10, 1926; Los Angeles, California, U.S.
- Died: April 7, 2023 (aged 96); Walnut Creek, California, U.S.
- Education: Phillips University, University of California, Los Angeles (Ph.D., 1958)
- Known for: Evolution (1977), with Theodosius Dobzhansky, G. Ledyard Stebbins and Francisco J. Ayala
- Spouse: Diane Mondragon
- Children: 3
- Awards: Fulbright scholar, Australia, Guggenheim fellow
- Scientific career
- Fields: Evolutionary biology
- Institutions: University of Missouri, University of California, Davis, University of California, Santa Barbara, University of California, Berkeley

James William Valentine (November 10, 1926 – April 7, 2023) was an American evolutionary biologist, Professor Emeritus in the Department of Integrative Biology at the University of California, Berkeley, and curator at the University of California Museum of Paleontology.

Valentine was born in Los Angeles, California on November 10, 1926. He was educated at Phillips University, (B.A., 1951) and the University of California, Los Angeles (M.A., 1954, Ph.D., 1958). Valentine married Diane Mondragon in 1987 and had 3 children. He died in Walnut Creek, California, on April 7, 2023, at the age of 96.

== Books ==
Valentine published widely, and in addition to peer-reviewed publications wrote several books:

- Evolutionary Paleoecology of the Marine Biosphere 1973 ISBN 0-13-293720-4
- Evolution 1977 with Theodosius Dobzhansky, G. Ledyard Stebbins and Ayala
- Evolving : The Theory And Processes Of Organic Evolution 1979 ISBN 0-8053-0310-3, with Francisco J. Ayala
- Phanerozoic Diversity Patterns : Profiles In Macroevolution 1985 ISBN 0-691-08374-6, editor
- On the Origin of Phyla 2004 ISBN 0-226-84548-6
- The Cambrian Explosion: The Construction of Animal Biodiversity, 2013 ISBN 978-1-936221-03-5, with Douglas Erwin
