= Flowering Plants: Evolution Above the Species Level =

1974 book by George Ledyard Stebbins

- Author: G. Ledyard Stebbins
- Publisher: Belknap Press
- Publication date: 1974
- Pages: 480
- ISBN: 0-674-30685-6

Flowering Plants: Evolution Above the Species Level is a book written by evolutionary biologist and botanist G. Ledyard Stebbins which was first published in 1974.

== Bibliography ==
- Stebbins, G. Ledyard (1974). Flowering Plants: Evolution Above the Species Level. Cambridge, Massachusetts: Harvard University Press. ISBN 0-674-30685-6.
