= E. C. Jeffrey =

Canadian-American botanist (1866–1952)

Edward Charles Jeffrey
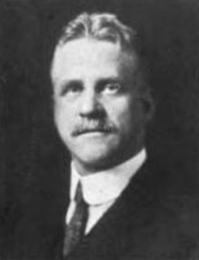
- Born: May 21, 1866; St. Catharines, Canada West
- Died: April 19, 1952 (aged 85)
- Education: Harvard University
- Known for: phylogeny
- Scientific career
- Fields: botany

Edward Charles Jeffrey (May 21, 1866 – April 19, 1952) was a Canadian-American botanist who worked on vascular plant anatomy and phylogeny.

== Biography ==
E. C. Jeffrey was born in St. Catharines, Canada West. From 1892 to 1902, he was a lecturer at the University of Toronto. While on leave of absence, he received his Ph.D. from Harvard University in 1899. In 1902 he became there an assistant professor of vegetable histology. In 1907 he was promoted to a full professorship of plant morphology. In 1933 he retired from Harvard University as professor emeritus.

In 1906, Jeffrey was elected a member of the American Academy of Arts and Sciences.

== Death ==
E. C. Jeffrey died on April 19, 1952.

== Bibliography ==
- Edward C. Jeffrey (1912). "The history, comparative anatomy and evolution of the Araucarioxylon type". Daedalus. 48: 529–540 plus 2 plates.
- —— (1917). The anatomy of woody plants. The University of Chicago Press; x+478 pages
- —— (1924). The origin and organization of coal. Memoirs of the American academy of arts and sciences, v. 15, no. 1.
- —— (1925). Coal and civilization. The Macmillan company.
