= Modern synthesis (20th century) =

Fusion of natural selection with Mendelian inheritance

Several major ideas about evolution came together in the population genetics of the early 20th century to form the modern synthesis, including genetic variation, natural selection, and particulate (Mendelian) inheritance. This ended the eclipse of Darwinism and supplanted a variety of non-Darwinian theories of evolution.

The modern synthesis (Note: Also known variously as the New Synthesis, the Modern Evolutionary Synthesis, the Evolutionary Synthesis, and the neo-Darwinian Synthesis. These alternative terms are ambiguous as they could possibly include later syntheses, so this article uses Julian Huxley's 1942 "modern synthesis" throughout.) was the early 20th-century synthesis of Charles Darwin's theory of evolution and Gregor Mendel's ideas on heredity into a joint mathematical framework. Julian Huxley coined the term in his 1942 book, Evolution: The Modern Synthesis. The synthesis combined the ideas of natural selection, Mendelian genetics, and population genetics. It also related the broad-scale macroevolution seen by palaeontologists to the small-scale microevolution of local populations.

The synthesis was defined differently by its founders, with Ernst Mayr in 1959, G. Ledyard Stebbins in 1966, and Theodosius Dobzhansky in 1974 offering differing basic postulates, though they all include natural selection, working on heritable variation supplied by mutation. Other major figures in the synthesis included E. B. Ford, Bernhard Rensch, Ivan Schmalhausen, and George Gaylord Simpson. An early event in the modern synthesis was R. A. Fisher's 1918 paper on mathematical population genetics, though William Bateson, and separately Udny Yule, had already started to show how Mendelian genetics could work in evolution in 1902.

Different syntheses followed, including with social behaviour in E. O. Wilson's sociobiology in 1975, evolutionary developmental biology's integration of embryology with genetics and evolution, starting in 1977, and Massimo Pigliucci's and Gerd B. Müller's proposed extended evolutionary synthesis of 2007. In the view of evolutionary biologist Eugene Koonin in 2009, the modern synthesis will be replaced by a 'post-modern' synthesis that will include revolutionary changes in molecular biology, the study of prokaryotes and the resulting tree of life, and genomics.

== Developments leading up to the synthesis ==
Darwin's pangenesis theory. Every part of the body emits tiny gemmules which migrate to the gonads and contribute to the next generation via the fertilised egg. Changes to the body during an organism's life would be inherited, as in Lamarckism.

=== Darwin's evolution by natural selection, 1859 ===
Charles Darwin's 1859 book, On the Origin of Species, convinced most biologists that evolution had occurred, but not that natural selection was its primary mechanism. In the 19th and early 20th centuries, variations of Lamarckism (inheritance of acquired characteristics), orthogenesis (progressive evolution), saltationism (evolution by jumps) and mutationism (evolution driven by mutations) were discussed as alternatives. Darwin himself had sympathy for Lamarckism, but Alfred Russel Wallace advocated natural selection and totally rejected Lamarckism. In 1880, Samuel Butler labelled Wallace's view neo-Darwinism.

Blending inheritance, implied by pangenesis, causes the averaging out of every characteristic, which as the engineer Fleeming Jenkin pointed out, would make evolution by natural selection impossible.

=== The eclipse of Darwinism, 1880s onwards ===
From the 1880s onwards, biologists grew skeptical of Darwinian evolution. This eclipse of Darwinism (in Julian Huxley's words) grew out of the weaknesses in Darwin's account, with respect to his view of inheritance. Darwin believed in blending inheritance, which implied that any new variation, even if beneficial, would be weakened by 50% at each generation, as the engineer Fleeming Jenkin noted in 1868. This in turn meant that small variations would not survive long enough to be selected. Blending would therefore directly oppose natural selection. In addition, Darwin and others considered Lamarckian inheritance of acquired characteristics entirely possible, and Darwin's 1868 theory of pangenesis, with contributions to the next generation (gemmules) flowing from all parts of the body, actually implied Lamarckism as well as blending.

=== Weismann's germ plasm, 1892 ===
August Weismann's germ plasm theory. The hereditary material, the germ plasm, is confined to the gonads and the gametes. Somatic cells (of the body) develop afresh in each generation from the germ plasm.

August Weismann's idea, set out in his 1892 book Das Keimplasma: eine Theorie der Vererbung ("The Germ Plasm: a Theory of Inheritance"), was that the hereditary material, which he called the germ plasm, and the rest of the body (the soma) had a one-way relationship: the germ-plasm formed the body, but the body did not influence the germ-plasm, except indirectly in its participation in a population subject to natural selection. If correct, this made Darwin's pangenesis wrong, and Lamarckian inheritance impossible. His experiment on mice, cutting off their tails and showing that their offspring had normal tails, demonstrated that inheritance was 'hard'. (Note: Peter Gauthier has however argued that Weismann's experiment showed only that injury did not affect the germplasm. It did not test the effect of Lamarckian use and disuse.) He argued strongly and dogmatically for Darwinism and against Lamarckism, polarising opinions among other scientists. This increased anti-Darwinian feeling, contributing to its eclipse.

== Disputed beginnings ==
=== Genetics, mutationism and biometrics, 1900–1918 ===
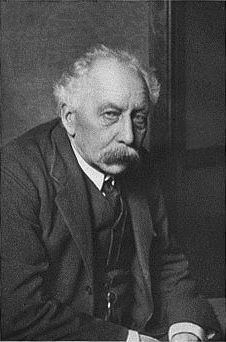
William Bateson championed Mendelism.

While carrying out breeding experiments to clarify the mechanism of inheritance in 1900, Hugo de Vries and Carl Correns independently rediscovered Gregor Mendel's work. News of this reached William Bateson in England, who reported on the paper during a presentation to the Royal Horticultural Society in May 1900. In Mendelian inheritance, the contributions of each parent retain their integrity, rather than blending with the contribution of the other parent. In the case of a cross between two true-breeding varieties such as Mendel's round and wrinkled peas, the first-generation offspring are all alike, in this case, all round. Allowing these to cross, the original characteristics reappear (segregation): about 3/4 of their offspring are round, 1/4 wrinkled. There is a discontinuity between the appearance of the offspring; de Vries coined the term allele for a variant form of an inherited characteristic. This reinforced a major division of thought, already present in the 1890s, between gradualists who followed Darwin, and saltationists such as Bateson.

The two schools were the Mendelians, such as Bateson and de Vries, who favoured mutationism, evolution driven by mutation, based on genes whose alleles segregated discretely like Mendel's peas; and the biometric school, led by Karl Pearson and Walter Weldon. The biometricians argued vigorously against mutationism, saying that empirical evidence indicated that variation was continuous in most organisms, not discrete as Mendelism seemed to predict; they wrongly believed that Mendelism inevitably implied evolution in discontinuous jumps.

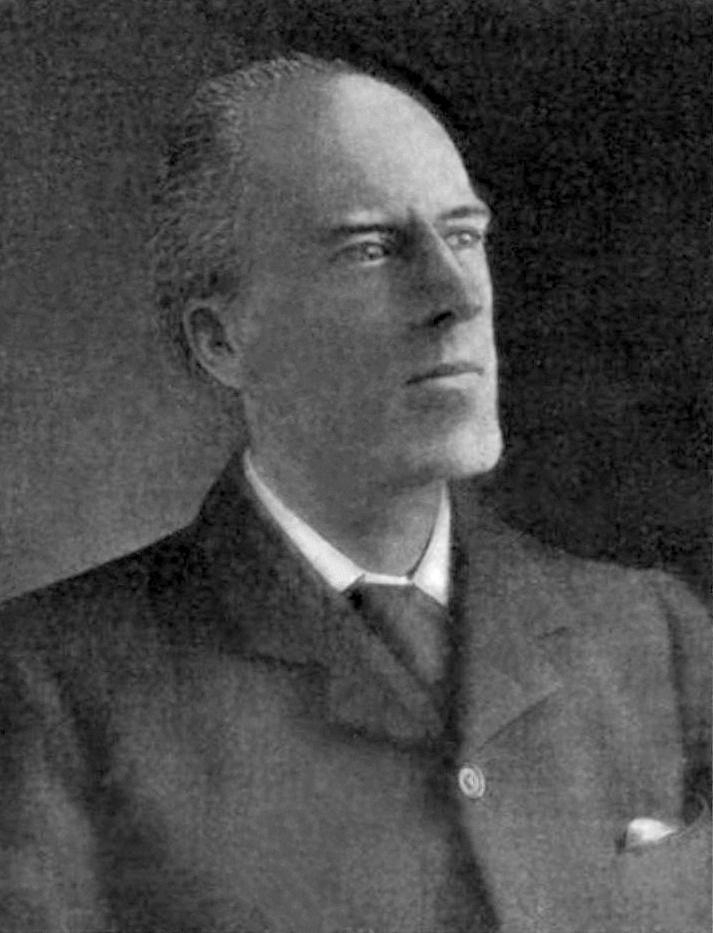
Karl Pearson led the biometric school.

A traditional view is that the biometricians and the Mendelians rejected natural selection and argued for their separate theories for 20 years, the debate only resolved by the development of population genetics. A more recent view is that Bateson, de Vries, Thomas Hunt Morgan and Reginald Punnett had by 1918 formed a synthesis of Mendelism and mutationism. The understanding achieved by these geneticists spanned the action of natural selection on alleles (alternative forms of a gene), the Hardy–Weinberg equilibrium, the evolution of continuously varying traits (like height), and the probability that a new mutation will become fixed. In this view, the early geneticists accepted natural selection but rejected Darwin's non-Mendelian ideas about variation and heredity, and the synthesis began soon after 1900. The traditional claim that Mendelians rejected the idea of continuous variation is false; as early as 1902, Bateson and Saunders wrote that "If there were even so few as, say, four or five pairs of possible allelomorphs, the various homo- and heterozygous combinations might, on seriation, give so near an approach to a continuous curve, that the purity of the elements would be unsuspected". Also in 1902, the statistician Udny Yule showed mathematically that given multiple factors, Mendel's theory enabled continuous variation. Yule criticised Bateson's approach as confrontational, but failed to prevent the Mendelians and the biometricians from falling out.

=== Castle's hooded rats, 1911 ===
Starting in 1906, William Castle carried out a long study of the effect of selection on coat colour in rats. The piebald or hooded pattern was recessive to the grey wild type. He crossed hooded rats with both wild and "Irish" types, and then back-crossed the offspring with pure hooded rats. The dark stripe on the back was bigger. He then tried selecting different groups for bigger or smaller stripes for 5 generations and found that it was possible to change the characteristics considerably beyond the initial range of variation. This effectively refuted de Vries's claim that continuous variation was caused by the environment and could not be inherited. By 1911, Castle noted that the results could be explained by Darwinian selection on a heritable variation of a sufficient number of Mendelian genes.

=== Morgan's fruit flies, 1912 ===
Thomas Hunt Morgan began his career in genetics as a saltationist and started out trying to demonstrate that mutations could produce new species in fruit flies. However, the experimental work at his lab with the fruit fly, Drosophila melanogaster (Note: Morgan's work with fruit flies helped establish the link between Mendelian genetics and the chromosomal theory of inheritance, that the hereditary material was embodied in these bodies within the cell nucleus.) showed that rather than creating new species in a single step, mutations increased the supply of genetic variation in the population. By 1912, after years of work on the genetics of fruit flies, Morgan showed that these insects had many small Mendelian factors (discovered as mutant flies) on which Darwinian evolution could work as if the variation was fully continuous. The way was open for geneticists to conclude that Mendelism supported Darwinism.

== An obstruction: Woodger's positivism, 1929 ==
The theoretical biologist and philosopher of biology Joseph Henry Woodger led the introduction of positivism into biology with his 1929 book Biological Principles. He saw a mature science as being characterised by a framework of hypotheses that could be verified by facts established by experiments. He criticised the traditional natural history style of biology, including the study of evolution, as immature science, since it relied on narrative. Woodger set out to play the role of Robert Boyle's 1661 Sceptical Chymist, intending to convert the subject of biology into a formal, unified science, and ultimately, following the Vienna Circle of logical positivists like Otto Neurath and Rudolf Carnap, to reduce biology to physics and chemistry. His efforts stimulated the biologist J. B. S. Haldane to push for the axiomatisation of biology, and by influencing thinkers such as Huxley, helped to bring about the modern synthesis. The positivist climate made natural history unfashionable, and in America, research and university-level teaching on evolution declined almost to nothing by the late 1930s. The Harvard physiologist William John Crozier told his students that evolution was not even a science: "You can't experiment with two million years!" The tide of opinion turned with the adoption of mathematical modelling and controlled experimentation in population genetics, combining genetics, ecology and evolution in a framework acceptable to positivism.

== Elements of the synthesis ==
=== Fisher and Haldane's mathematical population genetics, 1918–1930 ===
In 1918, R. A. Fisher wrote "The Correlation between Relatives on the Supposition of Mendelian Inheritance," which showed how continuous variation could come from a number of discrete genetic loci. In this and other papers, culminating in his 1930 book The Genetical Theory of Natural Selection, Fisher showed how Mendelian genetics was consistent with the idea of evolution by natural selection. (Note: Fisher also analysed sexual selection in his book, but his work was largely ignored, and Darwin's case for such selection misunderstood, so it formed no substantial part of the modern synthesis.)

In the 1920s, a series of papers by J. B. S. Haldane analyzed real-world examples of natural selection, such as the evolution of industrial melanism in peppered moths. and showed that natural selection could work even faster than Fisher had assumed. Both of these scholars, and others, such as Dobzhansky and Wright, wanted to raise biology to the standards of the physical sciences by basing it on mathematical modeling and empirical testing. Natural selection, once considered unverifiable, was becoming predictable, measurable, and testable.

=== De Beer's embryology, 1930 ===
The traditional view is that developmental biology played little part in the modern synthesis, but in his 1930 book Embryos and Ancestors, the evolutionary embryologist Gavin de Beer anticipated evolutionary developmental biology by showing that evolution could occur by heterochrony, such as in the retention of juvenile features in the adult. This, de Beer argued, could cause apparently sudden changes in the fossil record, since embryos fossilise poorly. As the gaps in the fossil record had been used as an argument against Darwin's gradualist evolution, de Beer's explanation supported the Darwinian position. However, despite de Beer, the modern synthesis largely ignored embryonic development when explaining the form of organisms, since population genetics appeared to be an adequate explanation of how such forms evolved. (Note: Though C. H. Waddington had called for embryology to be added to the synthesis in his 1953 paper "Epigenetics and Evolution".)

=== Wright's adaptive landscape, 1932 ===
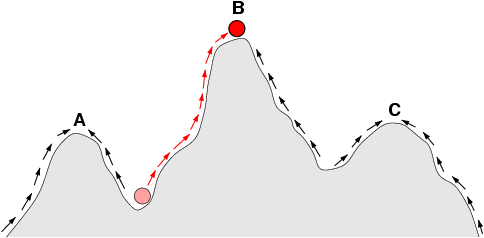
Sewall Wright introduced the idea of a fitness landscape with local optima.

The population geneticist Sewall Wright focused on combinations of genes that interacted as complexes, and the effects of inbreeding on small relatively isolated populations, which could be subject to genetic drift. In a 1932 paper, he introduced the concept of an adaptive landscape in which phenomena such as cross breeding and genetic drift in small populations could push them away from adaptive peaks, which would in turn allow natural selection to push them towards new adaptive peaks. Wright's model appealed to field naturalists such as Theodosius Dobzhansky and Ernst Mayr who were becoming aware of the importance of geographical isolation in real world populations. The work of Fisher, Haldane and Wright helped to found the discipline of theoretical population genetics.

=== Dobzhansky's evolutionary genetics, 1937 ===
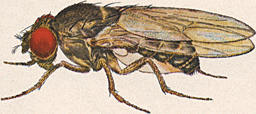
Drosophila pseudoobscura, the fruit fly which served as Theodosius Dobzhansky's model organism

Theodosius Dobzhansky, an immigrant from the Soviet Union to the United States, who had been a postdoctoral worker in Morgan's fruit fly lab, was one of the first to apply genetics to natural populations. He worked mostly with Drosophila pseudoobscura. He says pointedly: "Russia has a variety of climates from the Arctic to sub-tropical... Exclusively laboratory workers who neither possess nor wish to have any knowledge of living beings in nature were and are in a minority." Not surprisingly, there were other Russian geneticists with similar ideas, though for some time their work was known to only a few in the West. His 1937 work Genetics and the Origin of Species was a key step in bridging the gap between population geneticists and field naturalists. It presented the conclusions reached by Fisher, Haldane, and especially Wright in their highly mathematical papers in a form that was easily accessible to others. Further, Dobzhansky asserted the physicality, and hence the biological reality, of the mechanisms of inheritance: that evolution was based on material genes, arranged in a string on physical hereditary structures, the chromosomes, and linked more or less strongly to each other according to their actual physical distances on the chromosomes. As with Haldane and Fisher, Dobzhansky's "evolutionary genetics" was a genuine science, now unifying cell biology, genetics, and both micro and macroevolution. His work emphasized that real-world populations had far more genetic variability than the early population geneticists had assumed in their models and that genetically distinct sub-populations were important. Dobzhansky argued that natural selection worked to maintain genetic diversity as well as by driving change. He was influenced by his exposure in the 1920s to the work of Sergei Chetverikov, who had looked at the role of recessive genes in maintaining a reservoir of genetic variability in a population, before his work was shut down by the rise of Lysenkoism in the Soviet Union. By 1937, Dobzhansky was able to argue that mutations were the main source of evolutionary changes and variability, along with chromosome rearrangements, effects of genes on their neighbours during development, and polyploidy. Next, genetic drift (he used the term in 1941), selection, migration, and geographical isolation could change gene frequencies. Thirdly, mechanisms like ecological or sexual isolation and hybrid sterility could fix the results of the earlier processes.

=== Ford's ecological genetics, 1940 ===
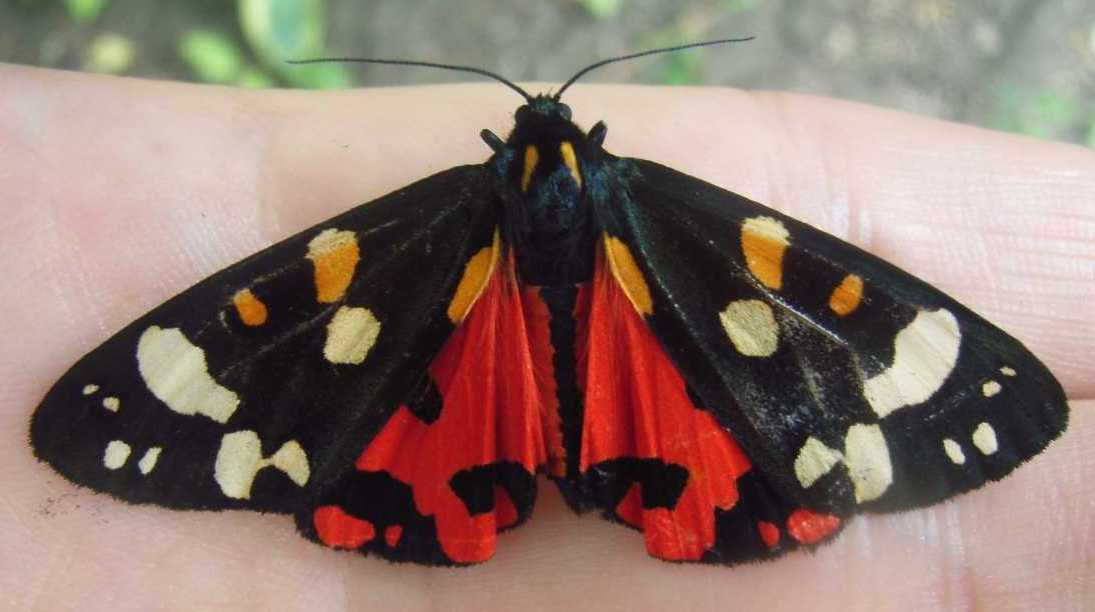
E. B. Ford studied polymorphism in the scarlet tiger moth for many years.

E. B. Ford was an experimental naturalist who wanted to test natural selection in nature, virtually inventing the field of ecological genetics. His work on natural selection in wild populations of butterflies and moths was the first to show that predictions made by R. A. Fisher were correct. In 1940, he was the first to describe and define genetic polymorphism, and to predict that human blood group polymorphisms might be maintained in the population by providing some protection against disease. His 1949 book Mendelism and Evolution helped to persuade Dobzhansky to change the emphasis in the third edition of his famous textbook Genetics and the Origin of Species from drift to selection.

=== Schmalhausen's stabilizing selection, 1941 ===
Ivan Schmalhausen developed the theory of stabilizing selection, the idea that selection can preserve a trait at some value, publishing a paper in Russian titled "Stabilizing selection and its place among factors of evolution" in 1941 and a monograph Factors of Evolution: The Theory of Stabilizing Selection in 1945. He developed it from J. M. Baldwin's 1902 concept that adaptive changes induced by an organism's agency or environment may ultimately be replaced by hereditary changes (including the Baldwin effect of behaviour), following that theory's implications to their Darwinian conclusion, and bringing him into conflict with Lysenkoism. Schmalhausen observed that stabilizing selection would remove most variations from the norm, most mutations being harmful. Dobzhansky called the work "an important missing link in the modern view of evolution".

=== Huxley's popularising synthesis, 1942 ===
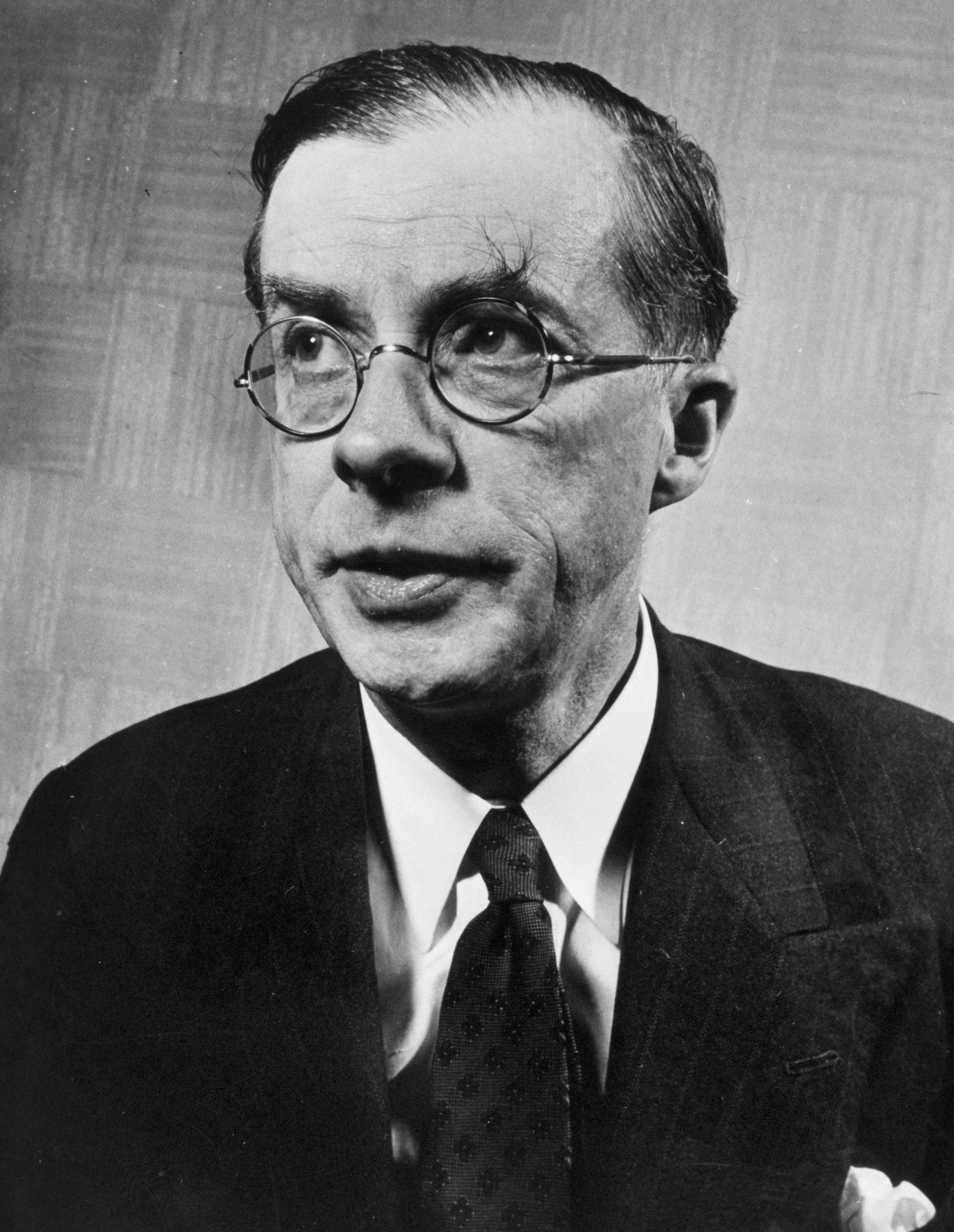
Julian Huxley presented a serious but popularising version of the theory in his 1942 book Evolution: The Modern Synthesis.

In 1942, Julian Huxley's serious but popularising book Evolution: The Modern Synthesis introduced a name for the synthesis and intentionally set out to promote a "synthetic point of view" on the evolutionary process. He imagined a wide synthesis of many sciences: genetics, developmental physiology, ecology, systematics, paleontology, cytology, and mathematical analysis of biology, and assumed that evolution would proceed differently in different groups of organisms according to how their genetic material was organised and their strategies for reproduction, leading to progressive but varying evolutionary trends. His vision was of an "evolutionary humanism", with a system of ethics and a meaningful place for "Man" in the world grounded in a unified theory of evolution which would demonstrate progress leading to humanity at its summit. Natural selection was in his view a "fact of nature capable of verification by observation and experiment", while the "period of synthesis" of the 1920s and 1930s had formed a "more unified science", rivalling physics and enabling the "rebirth of Darwinism".

However, the book was not the research text that it appeared to be. In the view of the philosopher of science Michael Ruse, and in Huxley's own opinion, Huxley was "a generalist, a synthesizer of ideas, rather than a specialist". Ruse observes that Huxley wrote as if he were adding empirical evidence to the mathematical framework established by Fisher and the population geneticists, but that this was not so. Huxley avoided mathematics, for instance not even mentioning Fisher's fundamental theorem of natural selection. Instead, Huxley used a mass of examples to demonstrate that natural selection is powerful and that it works on Mendelian genes. The book was successful in its goal of persuading readers of the reality of evolution, effectively illustrating topics such as island biogeography, speciation, and competition. Huxley further showed that the appearance of long-term orthogenetic trends – predictable directions for evolution – in the fossil record were readily explained as allometric growth (since parts are interconnected). All the same, Huxley did not reject orthogenesis out of hand, but maintained a belief in progress all his life, with Homo sapiens as the endpoint, and he had since 1912 been influenced by the vitalist philosopher Henri Bergson, though in public he maintained an atheistic position on evolution. Huxley's belief in progress within evolution and evolutionary humanism was shared in various forms by Dobzhansky, Mayr, Simpson and Stebbins, all of them writing about "the future of Mankind". Both Huxley and Dobzhansky admired the palaeontologist priest Pierre Teilhard de Chardin, Huxley writing the introduction to Teilhard's 1955 book on orthogenesis, The Phenomenon of Man. This vision required evolution to be seen as the central and guiding principle of biology.

=== Mayr's allopatric speciation, 1942 ===
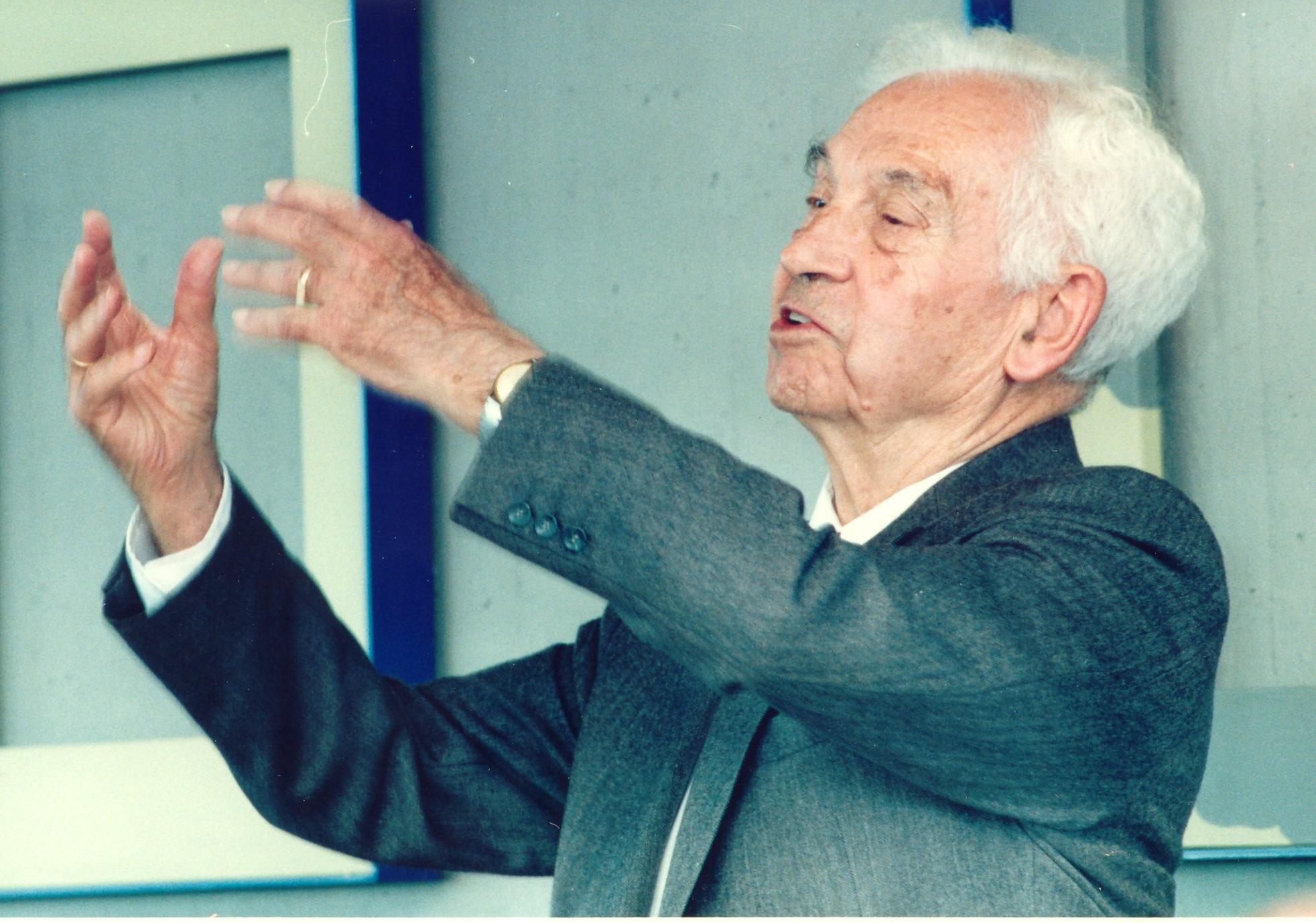
Ernst Mayr argued that geographic isolation was needed to provide sufficient reproductive isolation for new species to form.

Ernst Mayr's key contribution to the synthesis was Systematics and the Origin of Species, published in 1942. It asserted the importance of and set out to explain population variation in evolutionary processes including speciation. He analysed in particular the effects of polytypic species, geographic variation, and isolation by geographic and other means. Mayr emphasized the importance of allopatric speciation, where geographically isolated sub-populations diverge so far that reproductive isolation occurs. He was skeptical of the reality of sympatric speciation believing that geographical isolation was a prerequisite for building up intrinsic (reproductive) isolating mechanisms. Mayr also introduced the biological species concept that defined a species as a group of interbreeding or potentially interbreeding populations that were reproductively isolated from all other populations. Before he left Germany for the United States in 1930, Mayr had been influenced by the work of the German biologist Bernhard Rensch, who in the 1920s had analyzed the geographic distribution of polytypic species, paying particular attention to how variations between populations correlated with factors such as differences in climate.

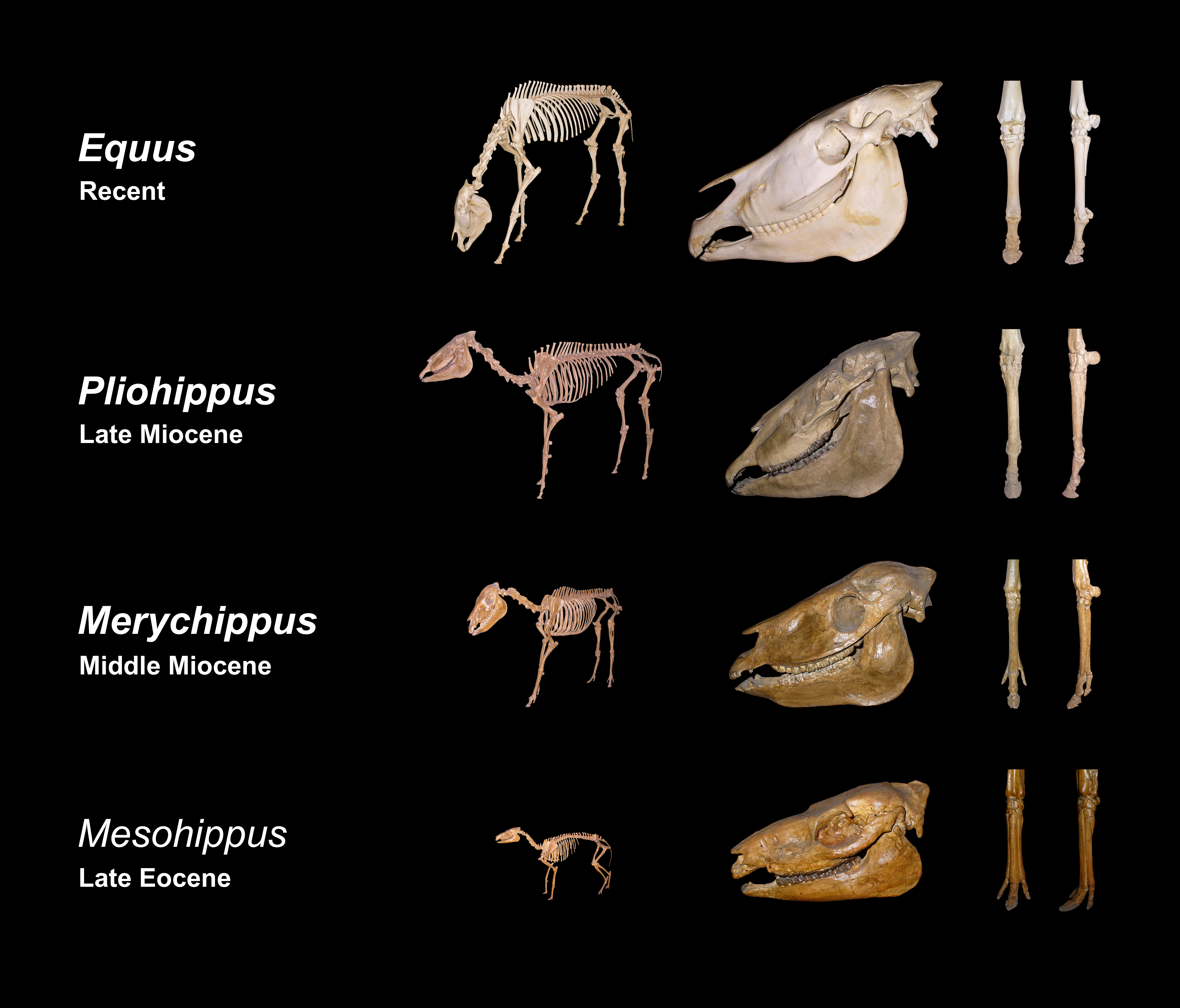
George Gaylord Simpson argued against the naive view that evolution such as of the horse took place in a "straight-line". He noted that any chosen line is one path in a complex branching tree, natural selection having no imposed direction.

=== Simpson's palaeontology, 1944 ===
George Gaylord Simpson was responsible for showing that the modern synthesis was compatible with palaeontology in his 1944 book Tempo and Mode in Evolution. Simpson's work was crucial because so many palaeontologists had disagreed, in some cases vigorously, with the idea that natural selection was the main mechanism of evolution. It showed that the trends of linear progression (in for example the evolution of the horse) that earlier palaeontologists had used as support for neo-Lamarckism and orthogenesis did not hold up under careful examination. Instead, the fossil record was consistent with the irregular, branching, and non-directional pattern predicted by the modern synthesis.

=== Society for the Study of Evolution, 1946 ===
During World War II, Mayr edited a series of bulletins of the Committee on Common Problems of Genetics, Paleontology, and Systematics, formed in 1943, reporting on discussions of a "synthetic attack" on the interdisciplinary problems of evolution. In 1946, the committee became the Society for the Study of Evolution, with Mayr, Dobzhansky and Sewall Wright the first of the signatories. Mayr became the editor of its journal, Evolution. From Mayr and Dobzhansky's point of view, suggests the historian of science Betty Smocovitis, Darwinism was reborn, evolutionary biology was legitimised, and genetics and evolution were synthesised into a newly unified science. Everything fitted into the new framework, except "heretics" like Richard Goldschmidt who annoyed Mayr and Dobzhansky by insisting on the possibility of speciation by macromutation, creating "hopeful monsters". The result was "bitter controversy".

Speciation via polyploidy: a diploid cell may fail to separate during meiosis, producing diploid gametes, which self-fertilize to produce a fertile tetraploid zygote that cannot interbreed with its parent species.

=== Stebbins's botany, 1950 ===
The botanist G. Ledyard Stebbins extended the synthesis to encompass botany. He described the important effects on speciation of hybridization and polyploidy in plants in his 1950 book Variation and Evolution in Plants. These permitted evolution to proceed rapidly at times, polyploidy in particular evidently being able to create new species effectively instantaneously.

== Definitions by the founders ==
The modern synthesis was defined differently by its various founders, with differing numbers of basic postulates, as shown in the table.

Definitions of the modern synthesis by its founders, as they numbered them
| Component | Mayr 1959 | Stebbins, 1966 | Dobzhansky, 1974 |
|---|---|---|---|
| Mutation | (1) Randomness in all events that produce new genotypes, e.g. mutation | (1) a source of variability, but not of direction | (1) yields genetic raw materials |
| Recombination | (1) Randomness in recombination, fertilisation | (2) a source of variability, but not of direction | |
| Chromosomal organisation | | (3) affects genetic linkage, arranges variation in gene pool | |
| Natural selection | (2) is only direction-giving factor, as seen in adaptations to physical and biotic environment | (4) guides changes to gene pool | (2) constructs evolutionary changes from genetic raw materials |
| Reproductive isolation | | (5) limits direction in which selection can guide the population | (3) makes divergence irreversible in sexual organisms |

== After the synthesis ==
After the synthesis, evolutionary biology continued to develop with major contributions from workers including W. D. Hamilton, George C. Williams, E. O. Wilson, Edward B. Lewis and others.

=== Hamilton's inclusive fitness, 1964 ===
In 1964, W. D. Hamilton published two papers on "The Genetical Evolution of Social Behaviour". These defined inclusive fitness as the number of offspring equivalents an individual rears, rescues or otherwise supports through its behaviour. This was contrasted with personal reproductive fitness, the number of offspring that the individual directly begets. Hamilton, and others such as John Maynard Smith, argued that a gene's success consisted in maximising the number of copies of itself, either by begetting them or by indirectly encouraging begetting by related individuals who shared the gene, the theory of kin selection.

=== Williams's gene-centred evolution, 1966 ===
In 1966, George C. Williams published Adaptation and Natural Selection, outlined a gene-centred view of evolution following Hamilton's concepts, disputing the idea of evolutionary progress, and attacking the then widespread theory of group selection. Williams argued that natural selection worked by changing the frequency of alleles, and could not work at the level of groups. Gene-centred evolution was popularised by Richard Dawkins in his 1976 book The Selfish Gene and developed in his more technical writings.

=== Wilson's sociobiology, 1975 ===
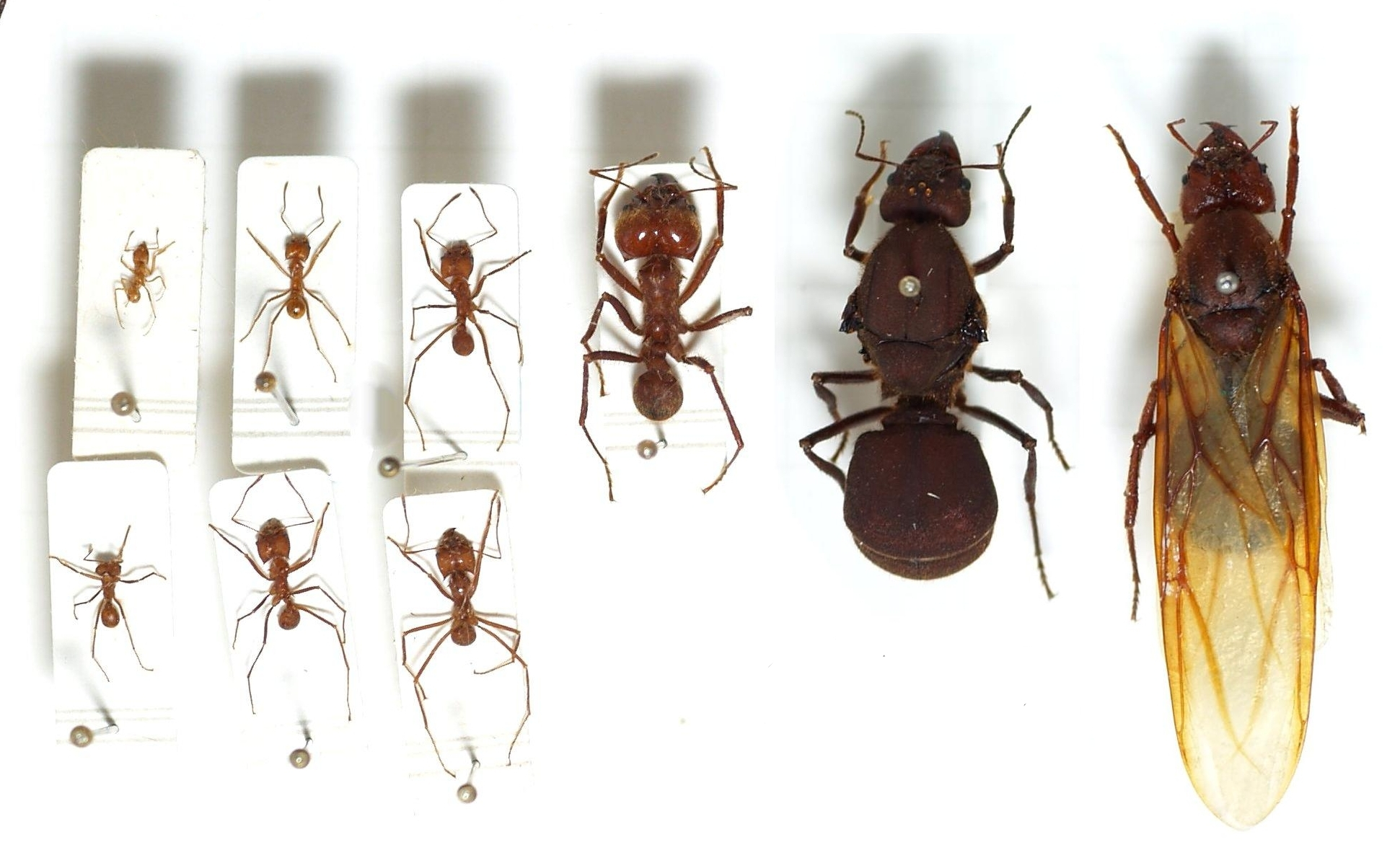
Ant societies have evolved elaborate caste structures, widely different in size and function.

In 1975, E. O. Wilson published his controversial book Sociobiology: The New Synthesis, the subtitle alluding to the modern synthesis as he attempted to bring the study of animal society into the evolutionary fold. This appeared radically new, although Wilson was following Darwin, Fisher, Dawkins and others. Critics such as Gerhard Lenski noted that he was following Huxley, Simpson and Dobzhansky's approach, which Lenski considered needlessly reductive as far as human society was concerned. By 2000, the proposed discipline of sociobiology had morphed into the relatively well-accepted discipline of evolutionary psychology.

=== Lewis's homeotic genes, 1978 ===
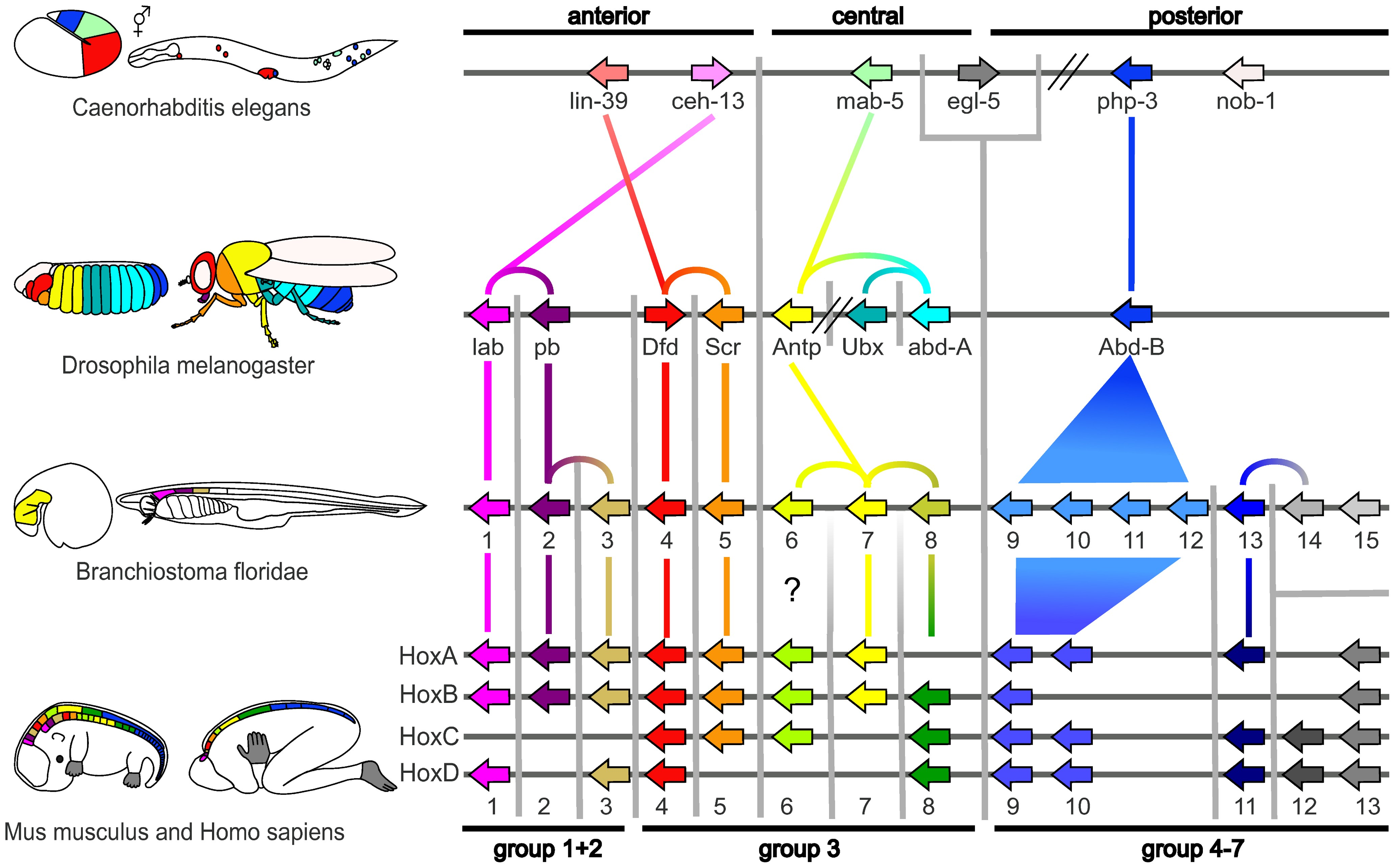
Evolutionary developmental biology has formed a synthesis of evolutionary and developmental biology, discovering deep homology between the embryogenesis of such different animals as insects and vertebrates.

In 1977, recombinant DNA technology enabled biologists to start to explore the genetic control of development. The growth of evolutionary developmental biology from 1978, when Edward B. Lewis discovered homeotic genes, showed that many so-called toolkit genes act to regulate development, influencing the expression of other genes. It also revealed that some of the regulatory genes are extremely ancient, so that animals as different as insects and mammals share control mechanisms; for example, the Pax6 gene is involved in forming the eyes of mice and of fruit flies. Such deep homology provided strong evidence for evolution and indicated the paths that evolution had taken.

== Later syntheses ==
In 1982, a historical note on a series of evolutionary biology books (Note: In a reissue of Dobzhansky's Genetics and the Origin of Species.) could state without qualification that evolution is the central organizing principle of biology. Smocovitis commented on this that "What the architects of the synthesis had worked to construct had by 1982 become a matter of fact", adding in a footnote that "the centrality of evolution had thus been rendered tacit knowledge, part of the received wisdom of the profession".

By the late 20th century, however, the modern synthesis was showing its age, and fresh syntheses to remedy its defects and fill in its gaps were proposed from different directions. These have included such diverse fields as the study of society, developmental biology, epigenetics, molecular biology, microbiology, genomics, symbiogenesis, and horizontal gene transfer. The physiologist Denis Noble argues that these additions render neo-Darwinism in the sense of the early 20th century's modern synthesis "at the least, incomplete as a theory of evolution", and one that has been falsified by later biological research.

Michael Rose and Todd Oakley argue that evolutionary biology, formerly divided and "Balkanized", has been brought together by genomics. It has in their view discarded at least five common assumptions from the modern synthesis, namely that the genome is always a well-organised set of genes; that each gene has a single function; that species are well adapted biochemically to their ecological niches; that species are the durable units of evolution, and all levels from organism to organ, cell and molecule within the species are characteristic of it; and that the design of every organism and cell is efficient. They argue that the "new biology" integrates genomics, bioinformatics, and evolutionary genetics into a general-purpose toolkit for a "Postmodern Synthesis".

=== Pigliucci's extended evolutionary synthesis, 2007 ===
In 2007, more than half a century after the modern synthesis, Massimo Pigliucci called for an extended evolutionary synthesis to incorporate aspects of biology that had not been included or had not existed in the mid-20th century. It revisits the relative importance of different factors, challenges assumptions made in the modern synthesis, and adds new factors such as multilevel selection, transgenerational epigenetic inheritance, niche construction, and evolvability.

=== Koonin's 'post-modern' evolutionary synthesis, 2009 ===
A 21st century tree of life showing horizontal gene transfers among prokaryotes and the saltational endosymbiosis events that created the eukaryotes, neither fitting into the 20th century's modern synthesis

In 2009, Darwin's 200th anniversary, the Origin of Species' 150th, and the 200th of Lamarck's "early evolutionary synthesis", Philosophie Zoologique, the evolutionary biologist Eugene Koonin stated that while "the edifice of the [early 20th century] Modern Synthesis has crumbled, apparently, beyond repair", a new 21st-century synthesis could be glimpsed. Three interlocking revolutions had, he argued, taken place in evolutionary biology: molecular, microbiological, and genomic. The molecular revolution included the neutral theory, that most mutations are neutral and that negative selection happens more often than the positive form, and that all current life evolved from a single common ancestor. In microbiology, the synthesis has expanded to cover the prokaryotes, using ribosomal RNA to form a tree of life. Finally, genomics brought together the molecular and microbiological syntheses - in particular, horizontal gene transfer between bacteria shows that prokaryotes can freely share genes. Many of these points had already been made by other researchers such as Ulrich Kutschera and Karl J. Niklas.

=== Towards a replacement synthesis ===
Inputs to the modern synthesis, with other topics (inverted colours) such as developmental biology that were not joined with evolutionary biology until the turn of the 21st century

Biologists, alongside scholars of the history and philosophy of biology, have continued to debate the need for, and possible nature of, a replacement synthesis. For example, in 2017 Philippe Huneman and Denis M. Walsh stated in their book Challenging the Modern Synthesis that numerous theorists had pointed out that the disciplines of embryological developmental theory, morphology, and ecology had been omitted. They noted that all such arguments amounted to a continuing desire to replace the modern synthesis with one that united "all biological fields of research related to evolution, adaptation, and diversity in a single theoretical framework." They observed further that there are two groups of challenges to the way the modern synthesis viewed inheritance. The first is that other modes such as epigenetic inheritance, phenotypic plasticity, the Baldwin effect, and the maternal effect allow new characteristics to arise and be passed on and for the genes to catch up with the new adaptations later. The second is that all such mechanisms are part, not of an inheritance system, but a developmental system: the fundamental unit is not a discrete selfishly competing gene, but a collaborating system that works at all levels from genes and cells to organisms and cultures to guide evolution. The molecular biologist Sean B. Carroll has commented that had Huxley had access to evolutionary developmental biology, "embryology would have been a cornerstone of his Modern Synthesis, and so evo-devo is today a key element of a more complete, expanded evolutionary synthesis."

== Historiography ==
Looking back at the conflicting accounts of the modern synthesis, the historian Betty Smocovitis notes in her 1996 book Unifying Biology: The Evolutionary Synthesis and Evolutionary Biology that both historians and philosophers of biology have attempted to grasp its scientific meaning, but have found it "a moving target"; the only thing they agreed on was that it was a historical event. In her words

by the late 1980s the notoriety of the evolutionary synthesis was recognized ... So notorious did 'the synthesis' become, that few serious historically minded analysts would touch the subject, let alone know where to begin to sort through the interpretive mess left behind by the numerous critics and commentators.

== See also ==
- Objections to evolution

== Sources ==
- Bateson, William (1894). Materials for the Study of Variation Treated with Especial Regard to Discontinuity in the Origin of Species. London; New York: Macmillan. LCCN 07001821. OCLC 1944285.
- Bowler, Peter J. (2003). Evolution: The History of an Idea (3rd completely rev. and expanded ed.). Berkeley, CA: University of California Press. ISBN 978-0-520-23693-6.
  - Bowler, Peter J. (1989). Evolution: The History of an Idea (2nd revised ed.). Berkeley, CA: University of California Press. ISBN 978-0-520-06386-0.
- Dobzhansky, Theodosius (1937). Genetics and the Origin of Species. Columbia University Biological Series. New York: Columbia University Press. LCCN 37033383. OCLC 766405.
  - —— (1951). Genetics and the Origin of Species. Columbia University Biological Series (3rd revised ed.). New York: Columbia University Press. LCCN 51014816. OCLC 295774.
- Fisher, R. A. (1999) [1930]. The Genetical Theory of Natural Selection. Edited with a foreword and notes by J. H. Bennett (A complete variorum ed.). Oxford, UK: Oxford University Press. ISBN 978-0-19-850440-5.
- Ford, E. B. (1964). "Ecological Genetics". Advancement of Science. 25 (124). London; New York: Methuen Publishing; John Wiley & Sons: 227–35. LCCN 64009038. OCLC 875507052. PMID 5701915.
  - —— (1975). "Ecological Genetics". Advancement of Science. 25 (124) (4th ed.). London; New York: Chapman and Hall; John Wiley & Sons: 227–35. LCCN 75002165. OCLC 1890603. PMID 5701915.
- Gould, Stephen Jay (1977). Ontogeny and Phylogeny. Belknap Press of Harvard University Press. ISBN 978-0-674-63940-9.
- Gould, Stephen Jay (2002). The Structure of Evolutionary Theory. Belknap Press of Harvard University Press. ISBN 978-0-674-00613-3.
- Grafen, Alan; Ridley, Mark, eds. (2006). Richard Dawkins: How a Scientist Changed the Way We Think. Oxford University Press. ISBN 978-0-19-929116-8.
- Huxley, Julian (2010) [1942]. Evolution: The Modern Synthesis. With a new foreword by Massimo Pigliucci and Gerd B. Müller (Definitive ed.). Cambridge, MA: MIT Press. ISBN 978-0-262-51366-1.
- Larson, Edward J. (2004). Evolution: The Remarkable History of a Scientific Theory. Modern Library Chronicles. Vol. 17. New York: Modern Library. ISBN 978-0-679-64288-6.
- Mayr, Ernst (1982). The Growth of Biological Thought: Diversity, Evolution, and Inheritance. Cambridge, MA: Belknap Press of Harvard University Press. ISBN 978-0-674-36445-5.
- Mayr, Ernst (1999) [1942]. Systematics and the Origin of Species from the Viewpoint of a Zoologist (1st Harvard University Press pbk. ed.). Harvard University Press. ISBN 978-0-674-86250-0.
- Mayr, Ernst; Provine, William B., eds. (1998) [1980]. The Evolutionary Synthesis: Perspectives on the Unification of Biology. With a new preface by Ernst Mayr (1st paperback ed.). Cambridge, MA: Harvard University Press. ISBN 978-0-674-27226-2.
- Provine, W. B. (2001). The Origins of Theoretical Population Genetics, with a new afterword. University of Chicago Press. ISBN 978-0-226-68464-2.
- Rensch, Bernhard (1947). Neuere Probleme der Abstammungslehre. Die transspezifische Evolution [Newer Problems of Evolutionary Theory: The trans-specific Evolution] (in German). Stuttgart: Ferdinand Enke Verlag. OCLC 2271422.
  - —— (1959). "Evolution Above the Species Level". American Journal of Physical Anthropology (English translation of 2nd edition of Neuere Probleme der Abstammungslehre (1954)). Columbia Biological Series. 19 (3): 408–410. doi:10.1002/ajpa.1330200329. LCCN 60002460. OCLC 3677530.
- Ruse, Michael (1996). Monad to Man: the Concept of Progress in Evolutionary Biology. Harvard University Press. ISBN 978-0-674-03248-4.
- Smocovitis, Vassiliki Betty (1996). "Unifying Biology: The Evolutionary Synthesis and Evolutionary Biology". Journal of the History of Biology. 25 (1). Princeton, NJ: Princeton University Press: 1–65. doi:10.1007/bf01947504. ISBN 978-0-691-03343-3. PMID 11623198. S2CID 189833728.
- Wright, Sewall (1932). "The Roles of Mutation, Inbreeding, Crossbreeding and Selection in Evolution". In Jones, Donald F. (ed.). Proceedings of the Sixth International Congress of Genetics. Vol. 1. Ithaca, NY: Genetics Society of America. OCLC 439596433.
