= Tempo and Mode in Evolution =

1944 book by George Gaylord Simpson

- Title page for Tempo and Mode in Evolution (1944)
- Author: George Gaylord Simpson
- Language: English
- Genre: Non-fiction
- Publisher: Columbia University Press, Hafner
- Publication date: 1944
- Publication place: United States
- ISBN: 9780028523507

Tempo and Mode in Evolution (1944) was George Gaylord Simpson's seminal contribution to the evolutionary synthesis, which integrated the facts of paleontology with those of genetics and natural selection.

Simpson argued that the microevolution of population genetics was sufficient in itself to explain the patterns of macroevolution observed by paleontology. Simpson also highlighted the distinction between tempo and mode. "Tempo" encompasses "evolutionary rates … their acceleration and deceleration, the conditions of exceptionally slow or rapid evolutions, and phenomena suggestive of inertia and momentum," while "mode" embraces "the study of the way, manner, or pattern of evolution, a study in which tempo is a basic factor, but which embraces considerably more than tempo."

Simpson's Tempo and Mode attempted to draw out several distinct generalizations:

- Evolution's tempo can impart information about its mode.
- Multiple tempos can be found in the fossil record: horotelic (medium tempo), bradytelic (slow tempo), and tachytelic (rapid tempo).
- The facts of paleontology are consistent with the genetical theory of natural selection. Moreover, theories such as orthogenesis, Lamarckism, mutation pressures, and macromutations either are false or play little to no role.
- Most evolution—"nine-tenths"—occurs by the steady phyletic transformation of whole lineages (anagenesis). This contrasts with Ernst Mayr's interpretation of speciation by splitting, particularly allopatric and peripatric speciation.
- The lack of evidence for evolutionary transitions in the fossil record is best accounted for, first, by the poverty of the geological record, and, second, as a consequence of quantum evolution (which is responsible for "the origin of taxonomic units of relatively high rank, such as families, orders, and classes"). Quantum evolution built upon Sewall Wright's theory of random genetic drift.

Tempo and Mode earned Simpson the Daniel Giraud Elliot Medal from the National Academy of Sciences in 1944. Fifty years after its publication, the National Academy of Sciences commissioned a book entitled Tempo and Mode in Evolution: Genetics and Paleontology 50 Years After Simpson edited by Walter M. Fitch and Francisco J. Ayala. It includes contributions by Ayala, Stephen Jay Gould, and W. Ford Doolittle.
