= George Gaylord Simpson =

American paleontologist (1902–1984)

George Gaylord Simpson ForMemRS
- Simpson in 1965
- Born: June 16, 1902; Chicago, Illinois
- Died: October 6, 1984 (aged 82); Tucson, Arizona
- Education: University of Colorado; Yale University, B.A., Ph.D.
- Known for: Modern synthesis; quantum evolution
- Awards: Mary Clark Thompson Medal (1943); Bronze Star (1944); Daniel Giraud Elliot Medal (1944); Hayden Memorial Geological Award (1950); Penrose Medal (1952); Darwin-Wallace Medal (1958); Darwin Medal (1962); Linnean Medal (1962); National Medal of Science (1965); Daniel Giraud Elliot Medal (1965); Paleontological Society Medal (1973)
- Scientific career
- Fields: Paleontology
- Workplaces: Columbia University
- Doctoral advisor: Richard Swann Lull
- Author abbrev. (zoology): Simpson

George Gaylord Simpson (June 16, 1902 – October 6, 1984) was an American paleontologist. Simpson was perhaps the most influential paleontologist of the twentieth century, and a major participant in the modern synthesis, contributing Tempo and Mode in Evolution (1944), The Meaning of Evolution (1949) and The Major Features of Evolution (1953). He was an expert on extinct mammals and their intercontinental migrations. Simpson was extraordinarily knowledgeable about Mesozoic fossil mammals and fossil mammals of North and South America. He anticipated such concepts as punctuated equilibrium (in Tempo and Mode) and dispelled the myth that the evolution of the horse was a linear process culminating in the modern Equus caballus. He coined the word hypodigm in 1940, and published extensively on the taxonomy of fossil and extant mammals. Simpson was influentially, and incorrectly, opposed to Alfred Wegener's theory of continental drift, but accepted the theory of plate tectonics (and continental drift) when the evidence became conclusive.

He was Professor of Zoology at Columbia University, and Curator of the Department of Geology and Paleontology at the American Museum of Natural History from 1945 to 1959. He was Curator of the Museum of Comparative Zoology at Harvard University from 1959 to 1970, and a Professor of Geosciences at the University of Arizona from 1968 until his retirement in 1982.

== Early life and education ==
George Gaylord Simpson was born on June 16, 1902 in Chicago to Helen J. (nee Kinney) and attorney Joseph A. Simpson, with two older sisters, Margaret and Martha. His mother was the daughter of missionaries and had attended Oberlin College. As an infant, Simpson's family moved to Denver, Colorado so that his father could purse land speculation and mining. He grew up in the Capitol Heights neighborhood and spent much of his time outdoors exploring the Rocky Mountain region, but was often unhealthy and plagued by a eye condition that made it difficult to participate in activities like sports. He attended public schools in Denver, graduating in 1918, at the age of 16, and going on to attend the University of Colorado at Boulder. Simpson was interested in creative writing and worked for a literary magazine, but turned his sights to science after taking a geology course under Arthur Tieje. In 1922, Simpson transferred to Yale University in order to pursue geology and paleontology, and graduated in 1923 with a bachelor's in geology.

== Military service ==
Simpson commissioned into the United States Army in 1942 as an intelligence officer. Simpson stunned his superiors when he completed a six week training course in intelligence methods in a single week. He went on to serve in the North African and Italian campaigns of World War II.

In one notable incident, Simpson's was seen by General George S. Patton sporting his signature goatee; Patton ordered him to shave it off. Simpson refused, not being within Patton's chain of command and working for the intelligence branch.

He was discharged in 1944 after contracting severe hepatitis at the rank of Major. Simpson earned two Bronze Stars over the course of his service in World War II.

== Awards and honors ==
Simpson was elected to the American Philosophical Society in 1936 and the United States National Academy of Sciences in 1941. In 1943 Simpson was awarded the Mary Clark Thompson Medal from the National Academy of Sciences. For his work, Tempo and mode in evolution, he was awarded the academy's Daniel Giraud Elliot Medal in 1944. He was elected to the American Academy of Arts and Sciences in 1948. He was awarded the Linnean Society of London's prestigious Darwin-Wallace Medal in 1958. Simpson also received the Royal Society's Darwin Medal 'In recognition of his distinguished contributions to general evolutionary theory, based on a profound study of palaeontology, particularly of vertebrates,' in 1962. In 1966, Simpson received the Golden Plate Award of the American Academy of Achievement.

At the University of Arizona, Tucson, the Gould-Simpson Building was named in honor of Simpson and Minnesota geologist and polar explorer Lawrence M. Gould, who, like Simpson, also accepted an appointment as Professor of Geosciences at the University of Arizona after his formal retirement. Simpson was noted for his work in the fields of paleobiogeography and animal evolution.

== Views ==
In his 1944 magnum opus Tempo and Mode in Evolution, Simpson placed significant emphasis on quantum evolution as a major component explaining the morphological change seen in the fossil record, though by the time of writing his 1953 work The Major Features of Evolution, this emphasis had waned. The evolution of Simpson's view on quantum evolution was not due to influence from Theodosius Dobzhansky and Ernst Mayr, as argued by Stephen Jay Gould, but due to the evidence presented by palaeontologists such as Bryan Patterson and Thomas Westoll.

Simpson excelled at mathematics, introducing statistical methods to examine biological variation in fossil taxa in Quantitative Zoology. He also was notable for applying the adaptive landscape developed by Sewall Wright to palaeontology.

Simpson was a bullish advocate for his research field of palaeontology, arguing that studying the fossil record was a necessity for answering macroevolutionary questions. Simpson's introduction of quantitative approaches to biological variation in the fossil record concordant with population thinking laid the foundations for the Palaeobiological Revolution of the 1970s and 1980s.

Due in part to his views on differing tempos of evolution, Simpson supported gradistic taxonomy, endorsing the view that humans should be classified as part of a separate family from all other great apes due to their highly derived features having come about from a rapid evolutionary tempo, while all other apes evolved more slowly.

Simpson strongly defended the autonomy of organismic biology and opposed the reductionist approaches to biology, which aimed to reduce biology to physico-chemical processes, that he saw as common among biochemists and molecular biologists.

Simpson was outspoken in his criticism of politically motivated pseudoscience and science denial, such as Lysenkoism and creationism. In his book Fossils and the History Of Life, Simpson wrote "The people of the Soviet Union learned the hard way that politicians cannot dictate how evolution works. The people of the United States need to know that politicians likewise cannot change the fact that evolution does indeed occur."

In the 1960s, Simpson "rubbished the then-nascent science of exobiology, which concerned itself with life on places other than Earth, as a science without a subject".

Simpson was raised as a Christian but in his early teens became an agnostic, nontheist, and philosophical naturalist. By the time of his academic career, Simpson was a convinced atheist.

== Personal life ==
As a senior at Yale, Simpson secretly married Lydia Pedroja, a Barnard student, and they had four daughters, Helen, Patricia Gaylord, Joan, and Elizabeth, before divorcing in 1938. Shortly afterwards, he married Dr. Anne Roe, his childhood friend and a clinical research psychologist.

== Books ==
- Attending marvels (1931)
- Quantitative Zoology (1939)
- Tempo and Mode in Evolution (1944)
- The Principles of Classification and A Classification of Mammals (1945)
- The Meaning of Evolution (1949, 1951)
- Horses (1951)
- Evolution and Geography (1953)
- The Major Features of Evolution (1953)
- Life: An Introduction to Biology (1957)
- Quantitative Zoology (1960)
- Principles of Animal Taxonomy (1961)
- This View of Life (1964)
- The Geography of Evolution (1965)
- Penguins (1976)
- Concession to the Improbable: An Unconventional Autobiography. New Haven and London: Yale University Press. 1978. ISBN 978-0-300-02143-1 – via Internet Archive.
- Splendid Isolation (1980)
- The Book of Darwin (1983)
- Fossils and the History Of Life (1983)
- The Dechronization of Sam Magruder (posthumously published novella, 1996)

== See also ==
- Annie Montague Alexander, who helped finance some of his early work
