= Systematics and the Origin of Species =

1942 book by Ernst Mayr

Systematics and the Origin of Species from the Viewpoint of a Zoologist
- Title page for Systematics and the Origin of Species from the Viewpoint of a Zoologist (1942)
- Author: Ernst Mayr
- Language: English
- Genre: Non-fiction
- Publisher: Columbia University Press
- Publication date: 1942
- Publication place: United States

Systematics and the Origin of Species from the Viewpoint of a Zoologist is a book written by zoologist and evolutionary biologist Ernst Mayr, first published in 1942 by Columbia University Press. The book became one of the canonical publications on the modern synthesis and is considered to be exemplary of the original expansion of evolutionary theory. The book is considered one of his greatest and most influential. This book is not to be confused with On the Origin of Species, by Charles Darwin.

Systematics and the Origin of Species from the Viewpoint of a Zoologist contains a reassessment of previous evidence regarding the mechanisms of biological evolution. The points of view of modern systematics are compared with views from other life science fields, attempting to bridge the gap between different biological disciplines. In his book, Mayr attempts to summarize the knowledge within his field of systemics, investigates the main factors involved in taxonomic work, and presents some evidence regarding the origin of species Species concepts are discussed and Mayr proposes a definition of the species category where he considers species groups of natural populations which are reproductively isolated from each other. This concept Ernst Mayr proposes here is now commonly referred to as the biological species concept. The biological species concept defines a species in terms of biological factors such as reproduction, taking into account ecology, geography, and life history; it remains an important and useful idea in biology, particularly for animal speciation. Despite acceptance and approval of his species definition, his input did little to resolve the long-standing disagreements concerning the issue of species concepts.

With his addition of the formulation of his species definition, Ernst Mayr was able to express the question of the species definition as a biological rather than topological issue After the publication of his species concept, Mayr became a major figure in the biological as well as the philosophical components of the debate regarding the problem of species concepts.

Systematics and the Origin of Species from the Viewpoint of a Zoologist was created after Ernst Mayr's Jesup lectures in New York City. Mayr's Jesup lectures were held alongside the botanist Edgar Anderson, who discussed evolutionary theory from the perspective of those with a background in botany. The lectures discussed population thinking, evolutionary dynamics between plants and animals, and other central issues in what the field that later came to be known as Evolutionary Synthesis. These Jesup lectures by Ernst Mayr and Edgar Anderson were meant as a follow-up to Theodosius Dobhanzky's own Jesup lectures in 1936 which resulted in his book Genetics and the Origin of Species, published in 1937. Edgar Anderson did not publish his talks from the 1941 Jesup lectures with Mayr.

In December 2004 the National Academy of Sciences held a colloquium in honour of Mayr's 100th birthday at the Arnold and Mabel Beckman Center of the National Academies of Science and Engineering in Irvine, California. Systematics and the Origin of Species: On Ernst Mayr's 100th Anniversary was published by National Academies Press in 2005 in commemoration of this event. The lectures published in this collection explore the main topics discussed in Ernst Mayr's Systematics and the Origin of Species from the Viewpoint of a Zoologist. These topics include reproductive isolation, the modern species concept, genomics, and other related subjects within evolutionary biology.

== Contents ==
1. The Methods and Principles of Systematics
2. Taxonomic Characters and Their Variation
3. Phenomena of Geographic Variation
4. Some Aspects of Geographic Variation
5. The Systematic Categories and the New Species Concept
6. The Polytypic Species, in Nature and in Systematics
7. The Species in Evolution
8. Nongeographic Speciation
9. The Biology of Speciation
10. The Higher Categories and Evolution
