= Adaptation =

Evolutionary process

In biology, adaptation has three related meanings. Firstly, it is the dynamic evolutionary process of natural selection that fits organisms to their environment, enhancing their evolutionary fitness. Secondly, it is a state reached by the population during that process. Thirdly, it is a phenotypic trait or adaptive trait, with a functional role in each individual organism, that is maintained and has evolved through natural selection.

Historically, adaptation has been described from the time of the ancient Greek philosophers such as Empedocles and Aristotle. In 18th and 19th-century natural theology, adaptation was taken as evidence for the existence of a deity. Charles Darwin and Alfred Russel Wallace proposed instead that it was explained by natural selection.

Adaptation is related to biological fitness, which governs the rate of evolution as measured by changes in allele frequencies. Often, two or more species co-adapt and co-evolve as they develop adaptations that interlock with those of the other species, such as with flowering plants and pollinating insects. In mimicry, species evolve to resemble other species; in mimicry this is a mutually beneficial co-evolution as each of a group of strongly defended species (such as wasps able to sting) come to advertise their defences in the same way. Features evolved for one purpose may be co-opted for a different one, as when the insulating feathers of dinosaurs were co-opted for bird flight.

Adaptation is a major topic in the philosophy of biology, as it concerns function and purpose (teleology). Some biologists try to avoid terms which imply purpose in adaptation, not least because they suggest a deity's intentions, but others note that adaptation is necessarily purposeful.

== History ==
Adaptation is an observable fact of life accepted by philosophers and natural historians from ancient times, independently of their views on evolution, but their explanations differed. Empedocles did not believe that adaptation required a final cause (a purpose), but thought that it "came about naturally, since such things survived." Aristotle did believe in final causes, but assumed that species were fixed.

The second of Jean-Baptiste Lamarck's two factors (the first being a complexifying force) was an adaptive force that causes animals with a given body plan to adapt to circumstances by inheritance of acquired characteristics, creating a diversity of species and genera.

In natural theology, adaptation was interpreted as the work of a deity and as evidence for the existence of God. William Paley believed that organisms were perfectly adapted to the lives they led, an argument that shadowed Gottfried Wilhelm Leibniz, who had argued that God had brought about "the best of all possible worlds." Voltaire's satire Dr. Pangloss is a parody of this optimistic idea, and David Hume also argued against design. Charles Darwin broke with the tradition by emphasising the flaws and limitations which occurred in the animal and plant worlds.

Jean-Baptiste Lamarck proposed a tendency for organisms to become more complex, moving up a ladder of progress, plus "the influence of circumstances", usually expressed as use and disuse. This second, subsidiary element of his theory is what is now called Lamarckism, a proto-evolutionary hypothesis of the inheritance of acquired characteristics, intended to explain adaptations by natural means.

Other natural historians, such as Buffon, accepted adaptation, and some also accepted evolution, without voicing their opinions as to the mechanism. This illustrates the real merit of Darwin and Alfred Russel Wallace, and secondary figures such as Henry Walter Bates, for putting forward a mechanism whose significance had only been glimpsed previously. A century later, experimental field studies and breeding experiments by people such as E. B. Ford and Theodosius Dobzhansky produced evidence that natural selection was not only the 'engine' behind adaptation, but was a much stronger force than had previously been thought.

== General principles ==
The significance of an adaptation can only be understood in relation to the total biology of the species.

— Julian Huxley, Evolution: The Modern Synthesis

=== What adaptation is ===
Adaptation is primarily a process rather than a physical form or part of a body. An internal parasite (such as a liver fluke) can illustrate the distinction: such a parasite may have a very simple bodily structure, but nevertheless the organism is highly adapted to its specific environment. From this we see that adaptation is not just a matter of visible traits: in such parasites critical adaptations take place in the life cycle, which is often quite complex. However, as a practical term, "adaptation" often refers to a product: those features of a species which result from the process. Many aspects of an animal or plant can be correctly called adaptations, though there are always some features whose function remains in doubt. By using the term adaptation for the evolutionary process, and adaptive trait for the bodily part or function (the product), one may distinguish the two different senses of the word.

Adaptation is one of the two main processes that explain the observed diversity of species, such as the different species of Darwin's finches. The other process is speciation, in which new species arise, typically through reproductive isolation. An example widely used today to study the interplay of adaptation and speciation is the evolution of cichlid fish in African lakes, where the question of reproductive isolation is complex.

Adaptation is not always a simple matter where the ideal phenotype evolves for a given environment. An organism must be viable at all stages of its development and at all stages of its evolution. This places constraints on the evolution of development, behaviour, and structure of organisms. The main constraint, over which there has been much debate, is the requirement that each genetic and phenotypic change during evolution should be relatively small, because developmental systems are so complex and interlinked. However, it is not clear what "relatively small" should mean, for example polyploidy in plants is a reasonably common large genetic change. The origin of eukaryotic endosymbiosis is a more dramatic example.

All adaptations help organisms survive in their ecological niches. The adaptive traits may be structural, behavioural or physiological. Structural adaptations are physical features of an organism, such as shape, body covering, armament, and internal organization. Behavioural adaptations are inherited systems of behaviour, whether inherited in detail as instincts, or as a neuropsychological capacity for learning. Examples include searching for food, mating, and vocalizations. Physiological adaptations permit the organism to perform special functions such as making venom, secreting slime, and phototropism, but also involve more general functions such as growth and development, temperature regulation, ionic balance and other aspects of homeostasis. Adaptation affects all aspects of the life of an organism.

The following definitions are given by the evolutionary biologist Theodosius Dobzhansky:

1. Adaptation is the evolutionary process whereby populations of organisms become better able to live in a habitat or habitats.
2. Adaptedness is the state of being adapted: the degree to which an organism is able to live and reproduce in a given set of habitats.
3. An adaptive trait is an aspect of the developmental pattern of the organism which enables or enhances the probability of that organism surviving and reproducing.

=== What adaptation is not ===
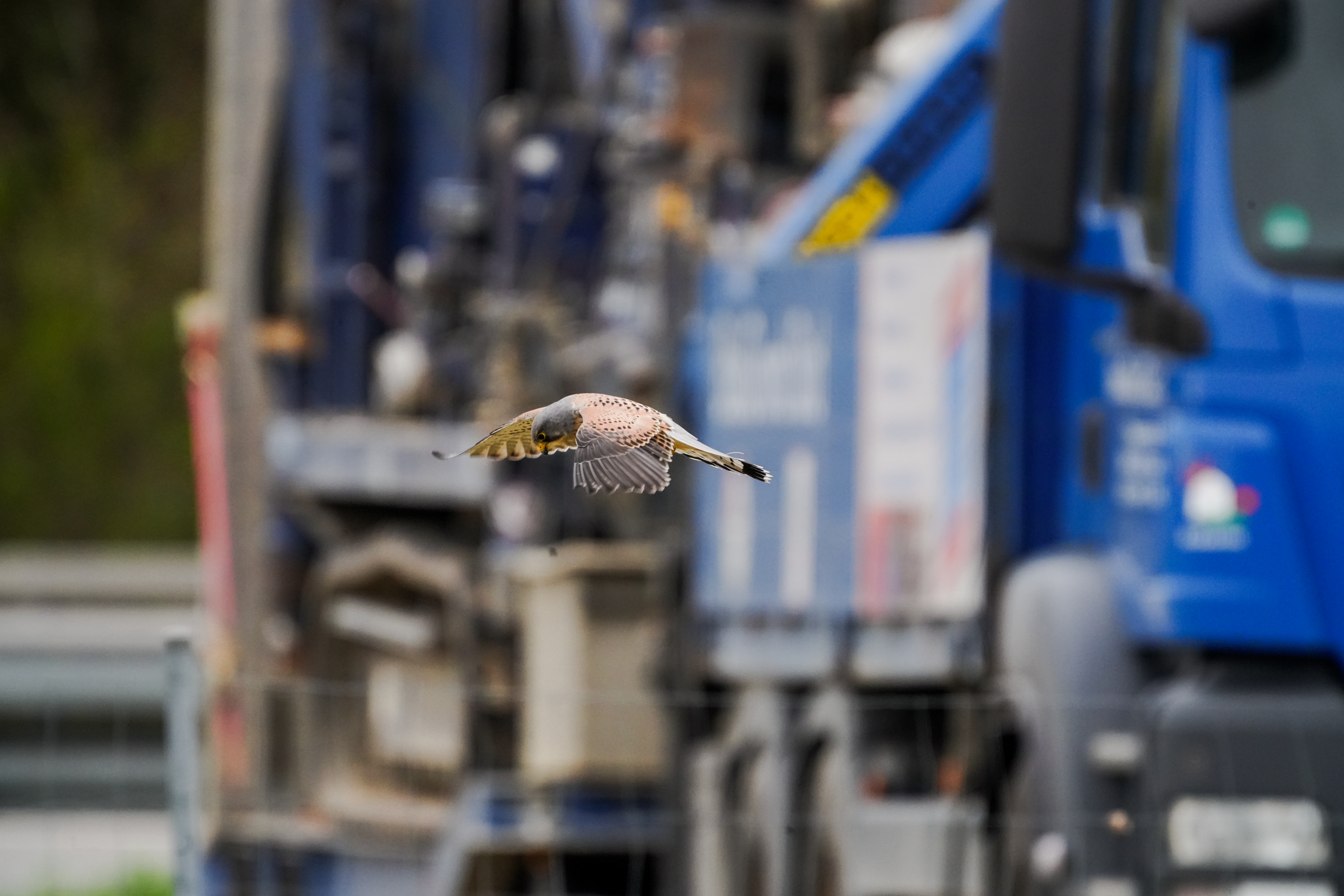
The common kestrel has adapted successfully to urban areas

Adaptation differs from flexibility, acclimatization, and learning, all of which are changes during life which are not inherited. Flexibility deals with the relative capacity of an organism to maintain itself in different habitats: its degree of specialization. Acclimatization describes automatic physiological adjustments during life; learning means alteration in behavioural performance during life.

Flexibility stems from phenotypic plasticity, the ability of an organism with a given genotype (genetic type) to change its phenotype (observable characteristics) in response to changes in its habitat, or to move to a different habitat. The degree of flexibility is inherited, and varies between individuals. A highly specialized animal or plant lives only in a well-defined habitat, eats a specific type of food, and cannot survive if its needs are not met. Many herbivores are like this; extreme examples are koalas which depend on Eucalyptus, and giant pandas which require bamboo. A generalist, on the other hand, eats a range of food, and can survive in many different conditions. Examples are humans, rats, crabs and many carnivores. The tendency to behave in a specialized or exploratory manner is inherited—it is an adaptation. Rather different is developmental flexibility: "An animal or plant is developmentally flexible if when it is raised in or transferred to new conditions, it changes in structure so that it is better fitted to survive in the new environment," writes the evolutionary biologist John Maynard Smith.

If humans move to a higher altitude, respiration and physical exertion become a problem, but after spending time in high altitude conditions they acclimatize to the reduced partial pressure of oxygen, such as by producing more red blood cells. The ability to acclimatize is an adaptation, but the acclimatization itself is not. The reproductive rate declines, but deaths from some tropical diseases also go down. Over a longer period of time, some people are better able to reproduce at high altitudes than others. They contribute more heavily to later generations, and gradually by natural selection the whole population becomes adapted to the new conditions. This has demonstrably occurred, as the observed performance of long-term communities at higher altitude is significantly better than the performance of new arrivals, even when the new arrivals have had time to acclimatize.

=== Adaptedness and fitness ===
There is a relationship between adaptedness and the concept of fitness used in population genetics. Differences in fitness between genotypes predict the rate of evolution by natural selection. Natural selection changes the relative frequencies of alternative phenotypes, insofar as they are heritable. However, a phenotype with high adaptedness may not have high fitness. Dobzhansky mentioned the example of the Californian redwood, which is highly adapted, but a relict species in danger of extinction. Elliott Sober commented that adaptation was a retrospective concept since it implied something about the history of a trait, whereas fitness predicts a trait's future.

1. Relative fitness. The average contribution to the next generation by a genotype or a class of genotypes, relative to the contributions of other genotypes in the population. This is also known as Darwinian fitness, selection coefficient, and other terms.
2. Absolute fitness. The absolute contribution to the next generation by a genotype or a class of genotypes. Also known as the Malthusian parameter when applied to the population as a whole.
3. Adaptedness. The extent to which a phenotype fits its local ecological niche. Researchers can sometimes test this through a reciprocal transplant.

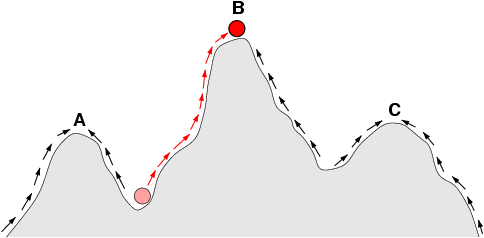
In this sketch of a fitness landscape, a population can evolve by following the arrows to the adaptive peak at point B, and the points A and C are local optima where a population could become trapped.

Sewall Wright proposed that populations occupy adaptive peaks on a fitness landscape. To evolve to another, higher peak, a population would first have to pass through a valley of maladaptive intermediate stages, and might be "trapped" on a peak that is not optimally adapted.

== Types ==
Adaptation is the heart and soul of evolution.

— Niles Eldredge, Reinventing Darwin: The Great Debate at the High Table of Evolutionary Theory

=== Changes in habitat ===
Before Darwin, adaptation was seen as a fixed relationship between an organism and its habitat. It was not appreciated that as the climate changed, so did the habitat; and as the habitat changed, so did the biota. Also, habitats are subject to changes in their biota: for example, invasions of species from other areas. The relative numbers of species in a given habitat are always changing. Change is the rule, though much depends on the speed and degree of the change. When the habitat changes, three main things may happen to a resident population: habitat tracking, genetic change or extinction. In fact, all three things may occur in sequence. Of these three effects only genetic change brings about adaptation. When a habitat changes, the resident population typically moves to more suitable places; this is the typical response of flying insects or oceanic organisms, which have wide (though not unlimited) opportunity for movement. This common response is called habitat tracking. It is one explanation put forward for the periods of apparent stasis in the fossil record (the punctuated equilibrium theory).

=== Genetic change ===
Without mutation, the ultimate source of all genetic variation, there would be no genetic changes and no subsequent adaptation through evolution by natural selection. Genetic change occurs in a population when mutation increases or decreases in its initial frequency followed by random genetic drift, migration, recombination or natural selection act on this genetic variation. One example is that the first pathways of enzyme-based metabolism at the very origin of life on Earth may have been co-opted components of the already-existing purine nucleotide metabolism, a metabolic pathway that evolved in an ancient RNA world. The co-option requires new mutations and through natural selection, the population then adapts genetically to its present circumstances. Genetic changes may result in entirely new or gradual change to visible structures, or they may adjust physiological activity in a way that suits the habitat. The varying shapes of the beaks of Darwin's finches, for example, are driven by adaptive mutations in the ALX1 gene. The coat color of different wild mouse species matches their environments, whether black lava or light sand, owing to adaptive mutations in the melanocortin 1 receptor and other melanin pathway genes. Physiological resistance to the heart poisons (cardiac glycosides) that monarch butterflies store in their bodies to protect themselves from predators are driven by adaptive mutations in the target of the poison, the sodium pump, resulting in target site insensitivity. These same adaptive mutations and similar changes at the same amino acid sites were found to evolve in a parallel manner in distantly related insects that feed on the same plants, and even in a bird that feeds on monarchs through convergent evolution, a hallmark of adaptation. Convergence at the gene-level across distantly related species can arise because of evolutionary constraint.

Habitats and biota do frequently change over time and space. Therefore, it follows that the process of adaptation is never fully complete. Over time, it may happen that the environment changes little, and the species comes to fit its surroundings better and better, resulting in stabilizing selection. On the other hand, it may happen that changes in the environment occur suddenly, and then the species becomes less and less well adapted. The only way for it to climb back up that fitness peak is via the introduction of new genetic variation for natural selection to act upon. Seen like this, adaptation is a genetic tracking process, which goes on all the time to some extent, but especially when the population cannot or does not move to another, less hostile area. Given enough genetic change, as well as specific demographic conditions, an adaptation may be enough to bring a population back from the brink of extinction in a process called evolutionary rescue. Adaptation does affect, to some extent, every species in a particular ecosystem.

Leigh Van Valen thought that even in a stable environment, because of antagonistic species interactions and limited resources, a species must constantly had to adapt to maintain its relative standing. This became known as the Red Queen hypothesis, as seen in host-parasite interactions.

Existing genetic variation and mutation were the traditional sources of material on which natural selection could act. In addition, horizontal gene transfer is possible between organisms in different species, using mechanisms as varied as gene cassettes, plasmids, transposons and viruses such as bacteriophages.

=== Co-adaptation ===
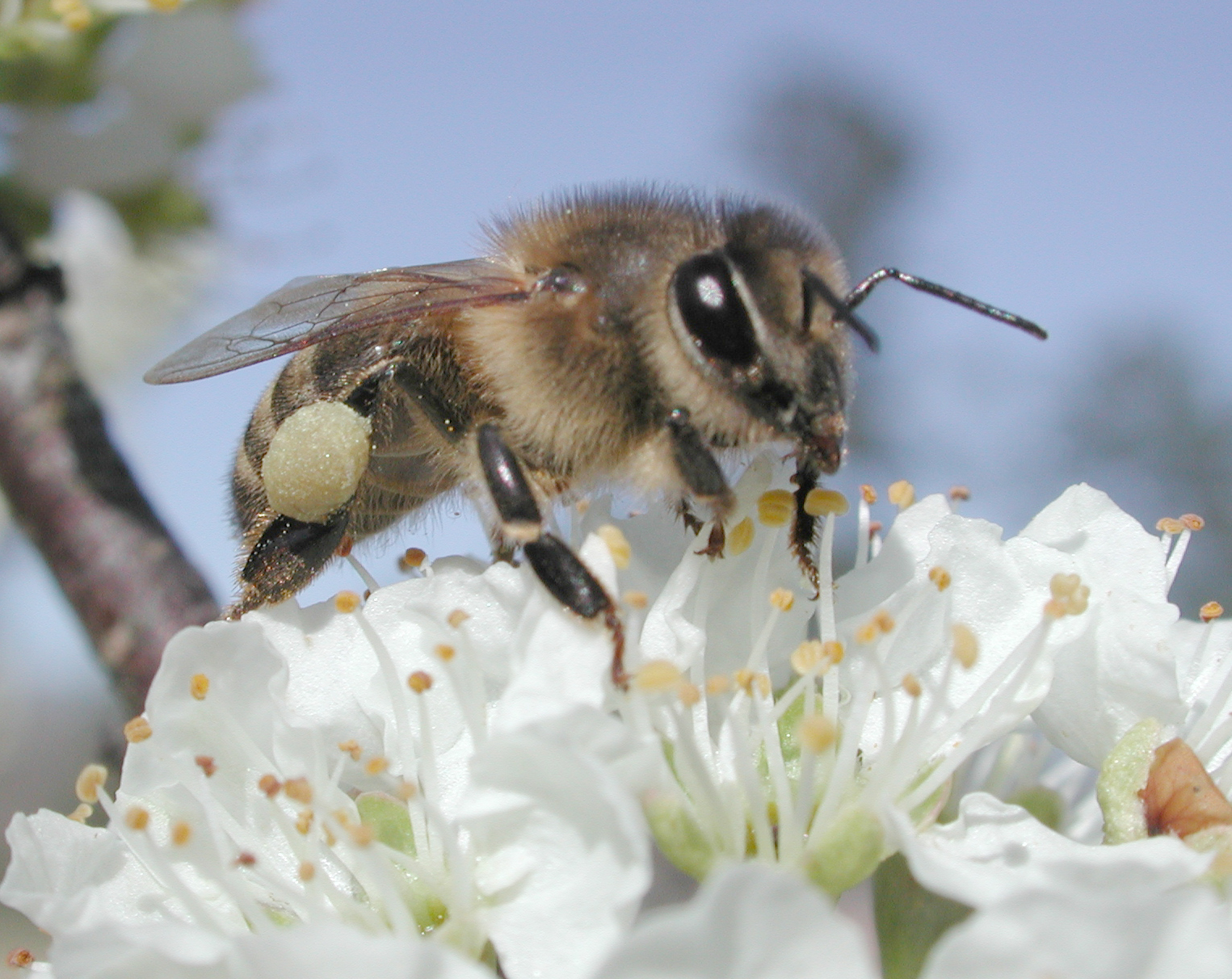
Pollinating insects are co-adapted with flowering plants.

In coevolution, where the existence of one species is tightly bound up with the life of another species, new or 'improved' adaptations which occur in one species are often followed by the appearance and spread of corresponding features in the other species. In other words, each species triggers reciprocal natural selection in the other. These co-adaptational relationships are intrinsically dynamic, and may continue on a trajectory for millions of years, as has occurred in the relationship between flowering plants and pollinating insects.

=== Mimicry ===
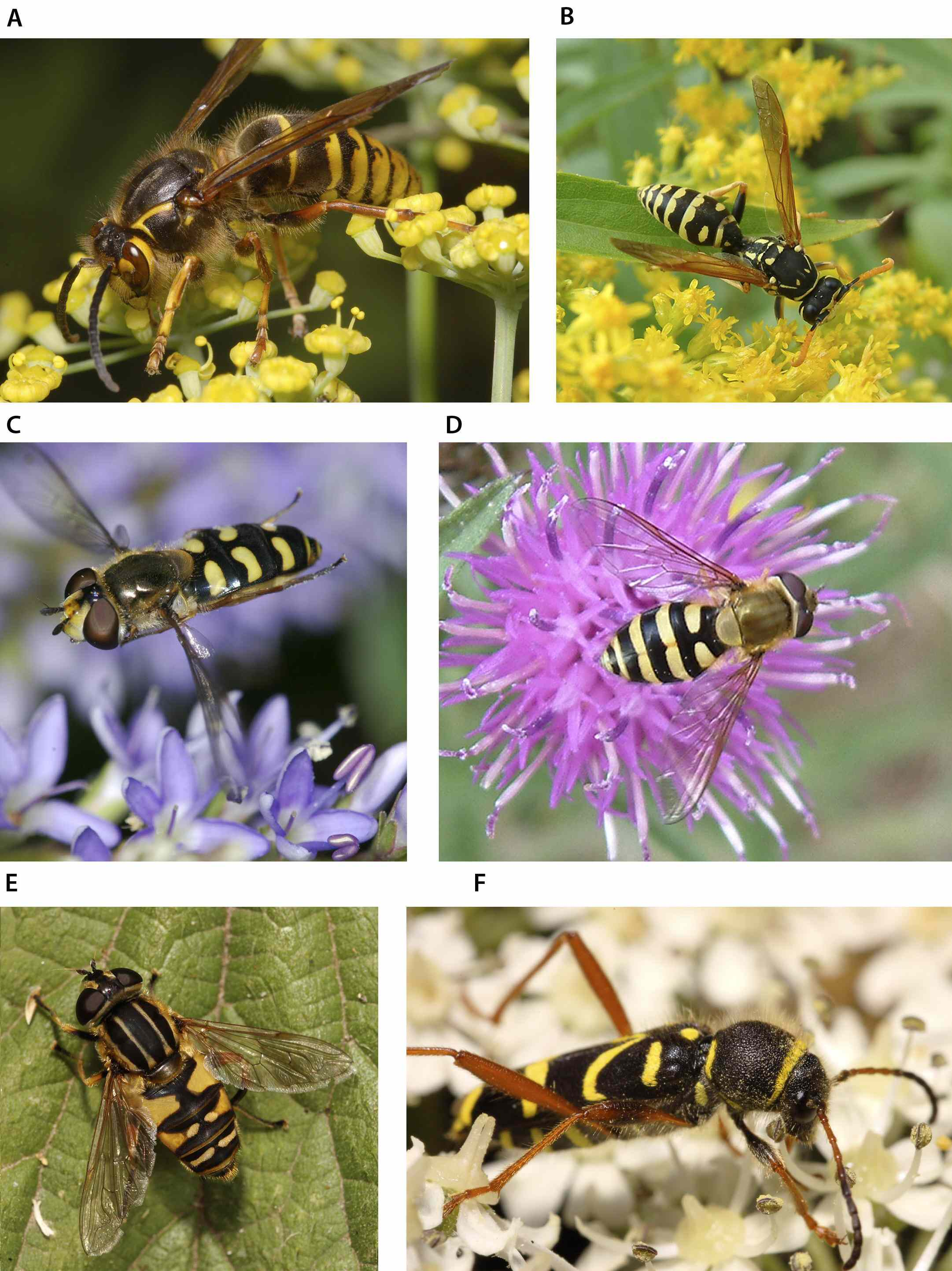
Images A and B show real wasps; the others show Batesian mimics: three hoverflies and one beetle.

Bates' work on Amazonian butterflies led him to develop the first scientific account of mimicry, especially the kind of mimicry which bears his name: Batesian mimicry. This is the mimicry by a palatable species of an unpalatable or noxious species (the model), gaining a selective advantage as predators avoid the model and therefore also the mimic. Mimicry is thus an anti-predator adaptation. A common example seen in temperate gardens is the hoverfly (Syrphidae), many of which—though bearing no sting—mimic the warning coloration of aculeate Hymenoptera (wasps and bees). Such mimicry does not need to be perfect to improve the survival of the palatable species.

Bates, Wallace and Fritz Müller believed that Batesian and Müllerian mimicry provided evidence for the action of natural selection, a view which is now standard amongst biologists.

=== Trade-offs ===
All adaptations have a downside: horse legs are great for running on grass, but they cannot scratch their backs; mammals' hair helps temperature, but offers a niche for ectoparasites; the only flying penguins do is under water. Adaptations serving different functions may be mutually destructive. Compromise and makeshift occur widely, not perfection. Selection pressures pull in different directions, and the adaptation that results is some kind of compromise.

It is a profound truth that Nature does not know best; that genetical evolution... is a story of waste, makeshift, compromise and blunder.

— Peter Medawar, The Future of Man

Since the phenotype as a whole is the target of selection, it is impossible to improve simultaneously all aspects of the phenotype to the same degree.

— Ernst Mayr, The Growth of Biological Thought: Diversity, Evolution, and Inheritance

==== Examples ====
Consider the antlers of the Irish elk, (often supposed to be far too large; in deer antler size has an allometric relationship to body size). Antlers serve positively for defence against predators, and to score victories in the annual rut. But they are costly in terms of resources. Their size during the last glacial period presumably depended on the relative gain and loss of reproductive capacity in the population of elks during that time. As another example, camouflage to avoid detection is destroyed when vivid coloration is displayed at mating time. Here the risk to life is counterbalanced by the necessity for reproduction.

Stream-dwelling salamanders, such as Caucasian salamander or Gold-striped salamander have very slender, long bodies, perfectly adapted to life at the banks of fast small rivers and mountain brooks. Elongated body protects their larvae from being washed out by current. However, elongated body increases risk of desiccation and decreases dispersal ability of the salamanders; it also negatively affects their fecundity. As a result, fire salamander, less perfectly adapted to the mountain brook habitats, is in general more successful, have a higher fecundity and broader geographic range.

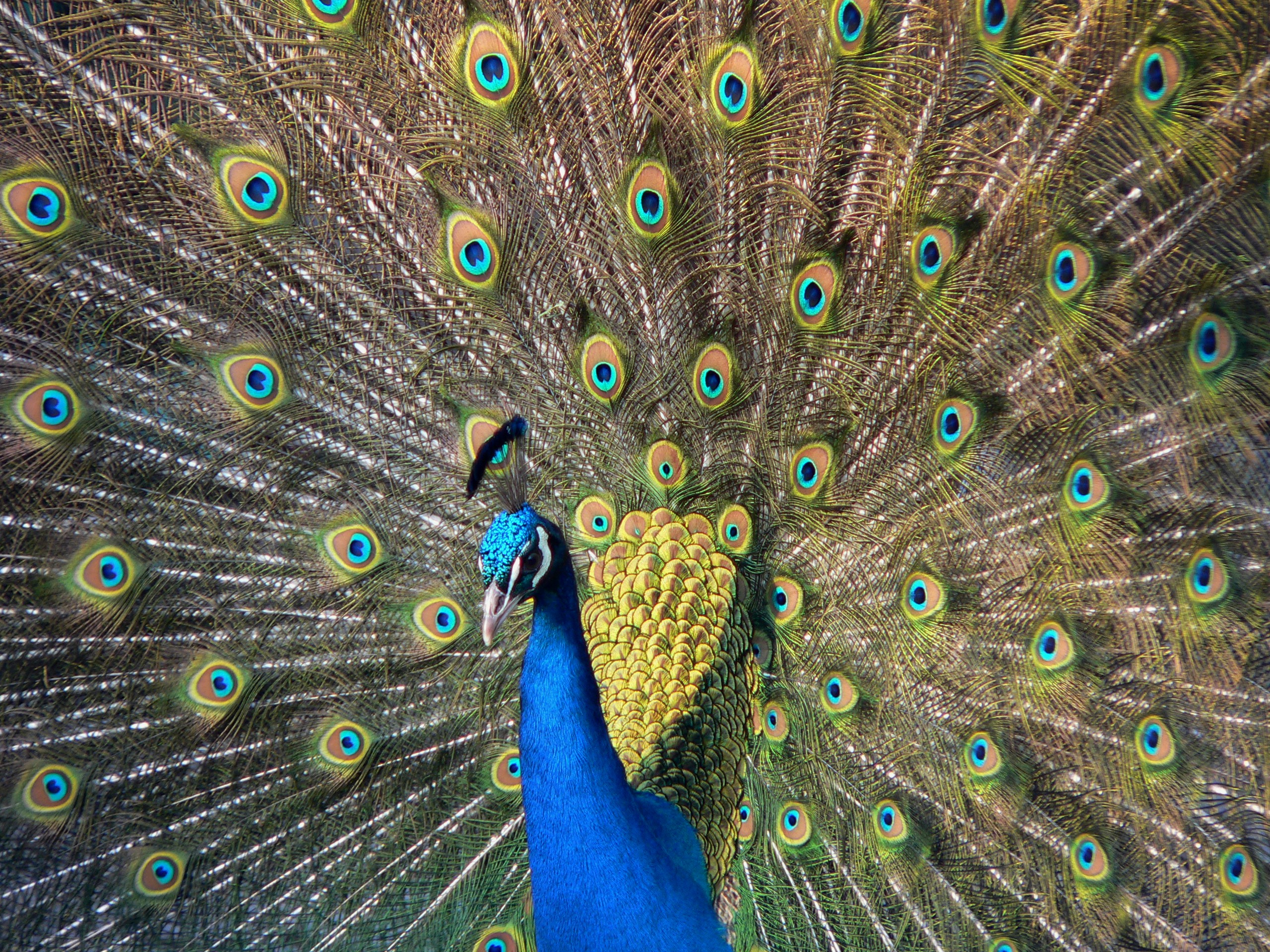
An Indian peacock's train in full display

The peacock's ornamental train (grown anew in time for each mating season) is a famous adaptation. It must reduce his maneuverability and flight, and is hugely conspicuous; also, its growth costs food resources. Darwin's explanation of its advantage was in terms of sexual selection: "This depends on the advantage which certain individuals have over other individuals of the same sex and species, in exclusive relation to reproduction." The kind of sexual selection represented by the peacock is called 'mate choice,' with an implication that the process selects the more fit over the less fit, and so has survival value. The recognition of sexual selection was for a long time in abeyance, but has been rehabilitated.

The conflict between the size of the human foetal brain at birth, (which cannot be larger than about 400 cm^{3}, else it will not get through the mother's pelvis) and the size needed for an adult brain (about 1400 cm^{3}), means the brain of a newborn child is quite immature. The most vital things in human life (locomotion, speech) just have to wait while the brain grows and matures. That is the result of the birth compromise. Much of the problem comes from our upright bipedal stance, without which our pelvis could be shaped more suitably for birth. Neanderthals had a similar problem.

As another example, the long neck of a giraffe brings benefits but at a cost. The neck of a giraffe can be up to 2 m (6 ft 7 in) in length. The benefits are that it can be used for inter-species competition or for foraging on tall trees where shorter herbivores cannot reach. The cost is that a long neck is heavy and adds to the animal's body mass, requiring additional energy to build the neck and to carry its weight around.

== Shifts in function ==
Adaptation and function are two aspects of one problem.

— Julian Huxley, Evolution: The Modern Synthesis

=== Pre-adaptation ===
Pre-adaptation occurs when a population has characteristics which by chance are suited for a set of conditions not previously experienced. For example, the polyploid cordgrass Spartina townsendii is better adapted than either of its parent species to their own habitat of saline marsh and mud-flats. Among domestic animals, the White Leghorn chicken is markedly more resistant to vitamin B_{1} deficiency than other breeds; on a plentiful diet this makes no difference, but on a restricted diet this preadaptation could be decisive.

Pre-adaptation may arise because a natural population carries a huge quantity of genetic variability. In diploid eukaryotes, this is a consequence of the system of sexual reproduction, where mutant alleles get partially shielded, for example, by genetic dominance. Microorganisms, with their huge populations, also carry a great deal of genetic variability. The first experimental evidence of the pre-adaptive nature of genetic variants in microorganisms was provided by Salvador Luria and Max Delbrück who developed the Fluctuation Test, a method to show the random fluctuation of pre-existing genetic changes that conferred resistance to bacteriophages in Escherichia coli. The word is controversial because it is teleological and the entire concept of natural selection depends on the presence of genetic variation, regardless of the population size of a species in question.

=== Co-option of existing traits: exaptation ===
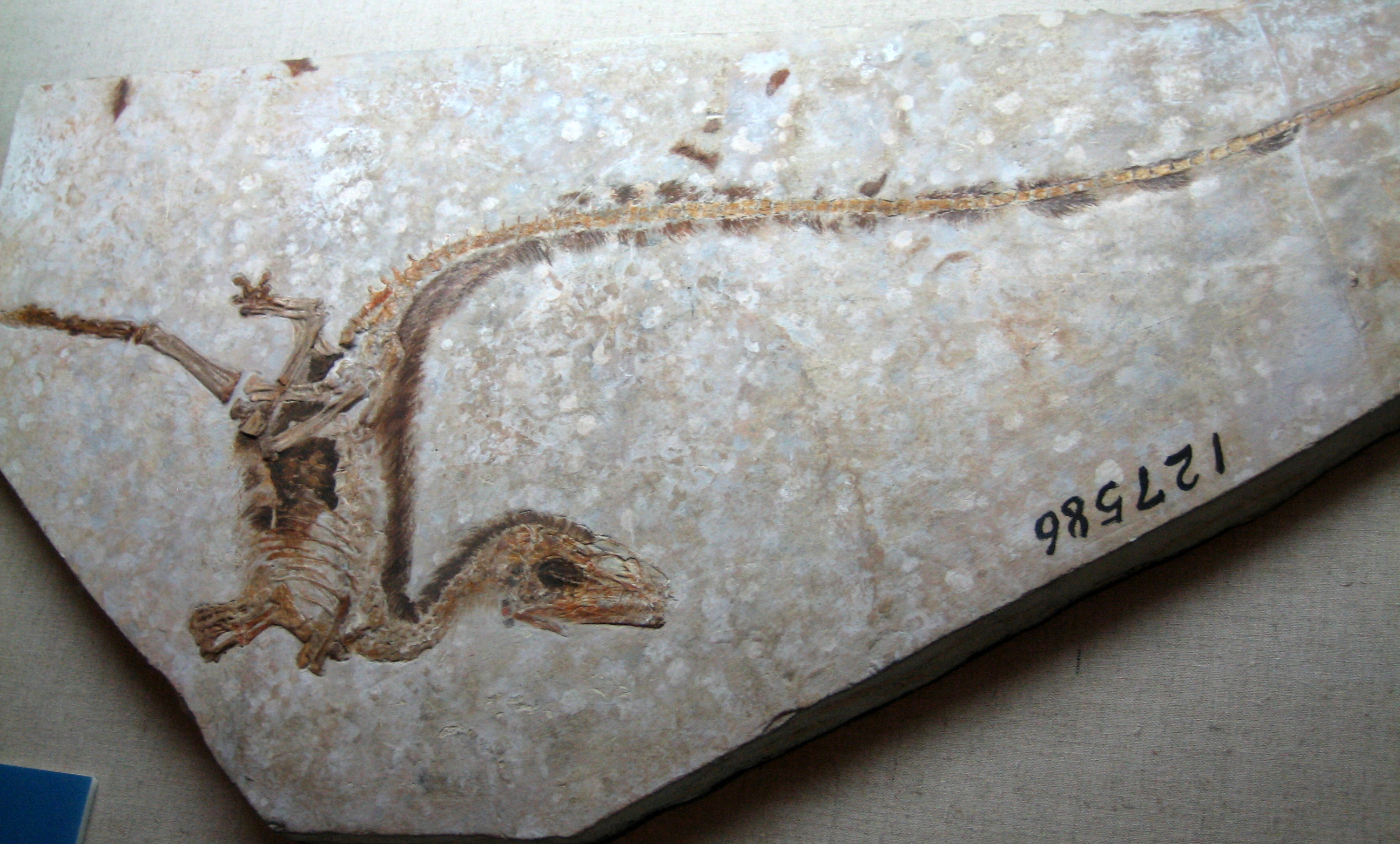
The feathers of dinosaur Sinosauropteryx, were used for insulation or display, making them an exaptation for flight.

Features that now appear as adaptations sometimes arose by co-option of existing traits, evolved for some other purpose. The classic example is the ear ossicles of mammals, which we know from paleontological and embryological evidence originated in the upper and lower jaws and the hyoid bone of their synapsid ancestors, and further back still were part of the gill arches of early fish. The word exaptation was coined to cover these common evolutionary shifts in function. The flight feathers of birds evolved from the much earlier feathers of dinosaurs, which might have been used for insulation or for display.

== Niche construction ==
Animals including earthworms, beavers and humans use some of their adaptations to modify their surroundings, so as to maximize their chances of surviving and reproducing. Beavers create dams and lodges, changing the ecosystems of the valleys around them. Earthworms, as Darwin noted, improve the topsoil in which they live by incorporating organic matter. Humans have constructed extensive civilizations with cities in environments as varied as the Arctic and hot deserts. In all three cases, the construction and maintenance of ecological niches helps drive the continued selection of the genes of these animals, in an environment that the animals have modified.

== Non-adaptive traits ==
Some traits do not appear to be adaptive as they have a neutral or deleterious effect on fitness in the current environment. Because genes often have pleiotropic effects, not all traits may be functional: they may be what Stephen Jay Gould and Richard Lewontin called spandrels, features brought about by neighbouring adaptations, on the analogy with the often highly decorated triangular areas between pairs of arches in architecture, which began as functionless features.

Another possibility is that a trait may have been adaptive at some point in an organism's evolutionary history, but a change in habitats caused what used to be an adaptation to become unnecessary or even maladapted. Such adaptations are termed vestigial. Many organisms have vestigial organs, which are the remnants of fully functional structures in their ancestors. As a result of changes in lifestyle the organs became redundant, and are either not functional or reduced in functionality. Since any structure represents some kind of cost to the general economy of the body, an advantage may accrue from their elimination once they are not functional. Examples: wisdom teeth in humans; the loss of pigment and functional eyes in cave fauna; the loss of structure in endoparasites.

== Extinction and coextinction ==
If a population cannot move or change sufficiently to preserve its long-term viability, then it will become extinct, at least in that locale. The species may or may not survive in other locales. Species extinction occurs when the death rate over the entire species exceeds the birth rate for a long enough period for the species to disappear. It was an observation of Van Valen that groups of species tend to have a characteristic and fairly regular rate of extinction.

Just as there is co-adaptation, there is also coextinction, the loss of a species due to the extinction of another with which it is coadapted, as with the extinction of a parasitic insect following the loss of its host, or when a flowering plant loses its pollinator, or when a food chain is disrupted.

== Origin of adaptive capacities ==
The first stage in the evolution of life on earth is often hypothesized to be the RNA world in which short self-replicating RNA molecules proliferated before the evolution of DNA and proteins. By this hypothesis, life started when RNA chains began to self-replicate, initiating the three mechanisms of Darwinian selection: heritability, variation of type, and competition for resources. The fitness of an RNA replicator (its per capita rate of increase) would likely have been a function of its intrinsic adaptive capacities, determined by its nucleotide sequence, and the availability of resources. The three primary adaptive capacities may have been: (1) replication with moderate fidelity, giving rise to heritability while allowing variation of type, (2) resistance to decay, and (3) acquisition of resources. These adaptive capacities would have been determined by the folded configurations of the RNA replicators resulting from their nucleotide sequences.

== Philosophical issues ==
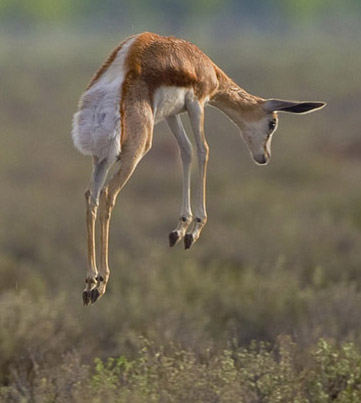
"Behaviour with a purpose": a young springbok stotting. A biologist might argue that this has the function of signalling to predators, helping the springbok to survive and allowing it to reproduce.

Adaptation raises philosophical issues concerning how biologists speak of function and purpose, as this carries implications of evolutionary history – that a feature evolved by natural selection for a specific reason – and potentially of supernatural intervention – that features and organisms exist because of a deity's conscious intentions. In his biology, Aristotle introduced teleology to describe the adaptedness of organisms, but without accepting the supernatural intention built into Plato's thinking, which Aristotle rejected. Modern biologists continue to face the same difficulty. On the one hand, adaptation is purposeful: natural selection chooses what works and eliminates what does not. On the other hand, biologists by and large reject conscious purpose in evolution. The dilemma gave rise to a famous joke by the evolutionary biologist Haldane: "Teleology is like a mistress to a biologist: he cannot live without her but he's unwilling to be seen with her in public.'" David Hull commented that Haldane's mistress "has become a lawfully wedded wife. Biologists no longer feel obligated to apologize for their use of teleological language; they flaunt it." Ernst Mayr stated that "adaptedness... is an a posteriori result rather than an a priori goal-seeking", meaning that the question of whether something is an adaptation can only be determined after the event.

== See also ==
- Adaptive evolution in the human genome
- Adaptive memory
- Adaptive mutation
- Adaptive system
- Anti-predator adaptation
- Body reactivity
- Ecological trap
- Evolutionary pressure
- Evolvability
- Intragenomic conflict
- Neutral theory of molecular evolution

== Sources ==
- Allin, Edgar F.; Hopson, James A. (1992). "Evolution of the Auditory System in Synapsida ("Mammal-Like Reptiles" and Primitive Mammals) as Seen in the Fossil Record". In Webster, Douglas B.; Fay, Richard R.; Popper, Arthur N. (eds.). The Evolutionary Biology of Hearing. Springer-Verlag. pp. 587–614. doi:10.1007/978-1-4612-2784-7_37. ISBN 978-0-387-97588-7. OCLC 23582549. "Based on a conference held at the Mote Marine Laboratory in Sarasota, Fla., May 20–24, 1990."
- Barrett, Paul H.; Gautrey, Peter J.; Herbert, Sandra; et al., eds. (1987). Charles Darwin's Notebooks, 1836–1844: Geology, Transmutation of Species, Metaphysical Enquiries. Cornell University Press. ISBN 978-0-521-09975-2. OCLC 16224403.
- Bowler, Peter J. (2003). Evolution: The History of an Idea (3rd completely rev. and expanded ed.). University of California Press. ISBN 978-0-520-23693-6. OCLC 49824702.
- Carpenter, G.D. Hale; Ford, E. B. (1933). Mimicry. With a Section on Its Genetic Aspect by E. B. Ford. Methuen's Monographs on Biological Subjects. Methuen. OCLC 875481859.
- Cronin, Helen (1991). The Ant and the Peacock: Altruism and Sexual Selection from Darwin to Today. Foreword by John Maynard Smith. Press Syndicate of the University of Cambridge. ISBN 978-0-521-32937-8. OCLC 23144516.
- Darwin, Charles (1871). The Descent of Man, and Selection in Relation to Sex. John Murray. OCLC 550912.
- Darwin, Charles (1872). The Origin of Species by Means of Natural Selection, or the Preservation of Favoured Races in the Struggle for Life (6th ed.). John Murray. OCLC 1185571. Archived from the original on 18 October 2014.
- Desmond, Adrian (1989). The Politics of Evolution: Morphology, Medicine, and Reform in Radical London. Science and its Conceptual Foundations. University of Chicago Press. ISBN 978-0-226-14346-0. OCLC 709606191.
- Dobzhansky, Theodosius (1968). "On Some Fundamental Concepts of Darwinian Biology". In Dobzhansky, Theodosius; Hecht, Max K.; Steere, William C. (eds.). Evolutionary Biology. Vol. 2. Appleton-Century-Crofts. pp. 1–34. doi:10.1007/978-1-4684-8094-8_1. ISBN 978-1-4684-8096-2. OCLC 24875357.
- Dobzhansky, Theodosius (1970). Genetics of the Evolutionary Process. Columbia University Press. ISBN 978-0-231-02837-0. OCLC 97663.
- Dobzhansky, Theodosius (1981). Lewontin, Richard C.; Moore, John A.; Provine, William B.; et al. (eds.). Dobzhansky's Genetics of Natural Populations I-XLIII. Columbia University Press. ISBN 978-0-231-05132-3. OCLC 7276406. "Papers by Dobzhansky and his collaborators, originally published 1937-1975 in various journals."
- Eldredge, Niles (1985). Time Frames: The Rethinking of Darwinian Evolution and the Theory of Punctuated Equilibria. Simon & Schuster. ISBN 978-0-671-49555-8. OCLC 11443805.
- Eldredge, Niles (1995). Reinventing Darwin: The Great Debate at the High Table of Evolutionary Theory. John Wiley & Sons. ISBN 978-0-471-30301-5. OCLC 30975979.
- Endler, John A. (1986). "Fitness and Adaptation". Natural Selection in the Wild. Monographs in Population Biology. Vol. 21. Princeton University Press. ISBN 978-0-691-08387-2. OCLC 12262762.
- Fisher, Ronald Aylmer (1930). The Genetical Theory of Natural Selection. The Clarendon Press. OCLC 493745635.
- Ford, E. B. (1975). "Ecological Genetics". Advancement of Science. 25 (124) (4th ed.). Chapman & Hall; John Wiley & Sons: 227–35. ISBN 978-0-470-26576-5. OCLC 1890603. PMID 5701915.
- Freeman, Scott; Herron, Jon C. (2007). Evolutionary Analysis (4th ed.). Pearson Prentice Hall. ISBN 978-0-13-227584-2. OCLC 73502978.
- Futuyma, Douglas J. (1986). Evolutionary Biology (2nd ed.). Sinauer Associates. ISBN 978-0-87893-188-0. OCLC 13822044.
- Hull, David L. (1982). "Philosophy and biology". In Fløistad, Guttorm (ed.). Philosophy of Science. Contemporary Philosophy: A New Survey. Vol. 2. Martinus Nijhoff Publishers; Springer Netherlands. doi:10.1007/978-94-010-9940-0. ISBN 978-90-247-2518-2. OCLC 502399533.
- Hutchinson, G. Evelyn (1965). The Ecological Theater and the Evolutionary Play. Yale University Press. OCLC 250039.
- Huxley, Julian (1942). Evolution: The Modern Synthesis. Allen & Unwin. OCLC 1399386.
- Margulis, Lynn; Fester, René, eds. (1991). Symbiosis as a Source of Evolutionary Innovation: Speciation and Morphogenesis. MIT Press. ISBN 978-0-262-13269-5. OCLC 22597587. "Based on a conference held in Bellagio, Italy, June 25–30, 1989"
- Maynard Smith, John (1993). The Theory of Evolution (Canto ed.). Cambridge University Press. ISBN 978-0-521-45128-4. OCLC 27676642.
- Mayr, Ernst (1963). Animal Species and Evolution. Belknap Press of Harvard University Press. ISBN 978-0-674-03750-2. OCLC 899044868.
- Mayr, Ernst (1965). "Cause and Effect in Biology". In Lerner, Daniel (ed.). Cause and Effect. The Hayden Colloquium on Scientific Method and Concept. Free Press. OCLC 384895.
- Mayr, Ernst (1982). The Growth of Biological Thought: Diversity, Evolution, and Inheritance. Belknap Press. ISBN 978-0-674-36445-5. OCLC 7875904.
- Mayr, Ernst (1988). Toward a New Philosophy of Biology: Observations of an Evolutionist. Belknap Press of Harvard University Press. ISBN 978-0-674-89665-9. OCLC 17108004.
- Medawar, Peter (1960). The Future of Man. The BBC Reith Lectures, 1959. Methuen. OCLC 1374615.
- Miller, Geoffrey (2007). "Brain Evolution". In Gangestad, Steven W.; Simpson, Jeffry A. (eds.). The Evolution of Mind: Fundamental Questions and Controversies. Guilford Press. ISBN 978-1-59385-408-9. OCLC 71005838.
- Monod, Jacques (1971). Chance and Necessity: An Essay on the Natural Philosophy of Modern Biology. Translation of Le hasard et la nécessité by Austryn Wainhouse (1st American ed.). Knopf. ISBN 978-0-394-46615-6. OCLC 209901.
- Moon, Harold Philip (1976). Henry Walter Bates FRS, 1825-1892: Explorer, Scientist, and Darwinian. Leicestershire Museums, Art Galleries, and Records Service. ISBN 978-0-904671-19-3. OCLC 3607387.
- Panchen, Alec L. (1992). Classification, Evolution and the Nature of Biology. Cambridge University Press. ISBN 978-0-521-31578-4. OCLC 24247430.
- Patterson, Colin (1999). Evolution. Comstock Book Series (2nd illustrated, revised ed.). Cornell University Press. ISBN 978-0-8014-8594-7. OCLC 39724234.
- Pittendrigh, Colin S. (1958). "Adaptation, Natural Selection, and Behavior". In Roe, Anne; Simpson, George Gaylord (eds.). Behavior and Evolution. Yale University Press. OCLC 191989.
- Price, Peter W. (1980). The Evolutionary Biology of Parasites. Monographs in Population Biology. Vol. 15. Princeton University Press. pp. 1–237. ISBN 978-0-691-08257-8. OCLC 5706295. PMID 6993919.
- Provine, William B. (1986). Sewall Wright and Evolutionary Biology. Science and its Conceptual Foundations. University of Chicago Press. ISBN 978-0-226-68474-1. OCLC 12808844.
- Ruxton, Graeme D.; Sherratt, Thomas N.; Speed, Michael P. (2004). Avoiding Attack: The Evolutionary Ecology of Crypsis, Warning Signals and Mimicry. Oxford Biology. Oxford University Press. ISBN 978-0-19-852859-3. OCLC 56644492.
- Sober, Elliott (1984). The Nature of Selection: Evolutionary Theory in Philosophical Focus. MIT Press. ISBN 978-0-262-19232-3. OCLC 11114517.
- Sober, Elliott (1993). Philosophy of Biology. Dimensions of Philosophy Series. Westview Press. ISBN 978-0-8133-0785-5. OCLC 26974492.
- Stebbins, G. Ledyard Jr. (1950). Variation and Evolution in Plants. Columbia Biological Series. Vol. 16. Columbia University Press. OCLC 294016.
- Sterelny, Kim; Griffiths, Paul E. (1999). Sex and Death: An Introduction to Philosophy of Biology. Science and its Conceptual Foundations. University of Chicago Press. ISBN 978-0-226-77304-9. OCLC 40193587.
- Wickler, Wolfgang (1968). Mimicry in Plants and Animals. World University Library. Translated from the German by R. D. Martin. McGraw-Hill. OCLC 160314.
- Williams, Edgar (2010). Giraffe. Animal (Reaktion Books). Reaktion Books. ISBN 978-1-86189-764-0. OCLC 587198932.
- Williams, George C. (1966). Adaptation and Natural Selection: A Critique of Some Current Evolutionary Thought. Princeton Science Library. Princeton University Press. ISBN 978-0-691-02615-2. OCLC 35230452.
- Wright, Sewall (1932). "The Roles of Mutation, Inbreeding, Crossbreeding and Selection in Evolution". In Jones, Donald F. (ed.). Proceedings of the Sixth International Congress of Genetics. Vol. 1. Genetics Society of America. OCLC 439596433.
