= Speciation =

Evolutionary process

Speciation is the evolutionary process by which populations evolve to become distinct species. The biologist Orator F. Cook coined the term in 1906 for cladogenesis, the splitting of lineages, as opposed to anagenesis, phyletic evolution within lineages. Charles Darwin was the first to describe the role of natural selection in speciation in his 1859 book On the Origin of Species. He also identified sexual selection as a likely mechanism, but found it problematic.

There are four geographic modes of speciation in nature, based on the extent to which speciating populations are isolated from one another: allopatric, peripatric, parapatric, and sympatric. Whether genetic drift is a minor or major contributor to speciation is the subject of much ongoing discussion.

Rapid sympatric speciation can take place through polyploidy, such as by doubling of chromosome number; the result is progeny which are immediately reproductively isolated from the parent population. New species can also be created through hybridization, followed by reproductive isolation, if the hybrid is favoured by natural selection.

== Historical background ==
In addressing the origin of species, there are two key issues:

1. the evolutionary mechanisms of speciation
2. how the separateness and individuality of species is maintained

Since Charles Darwin's time, efforts to understand the nature of species have primarily focused on the first aspect, and it is now widely agreed that the critical factor behind the origin of new species is reproductive isolation.

=== Darwin's dilemma: why do species exist? ===
In On the Origin of Species (1859), Darwin interpreted biological evolution in terms of natural selection, but was perplexed by the clustering of organisms into species. Chapter 6 of Darwin's book is entitled "Difficulties of the Theory". In discussing these "difficulties" he noted

Firstly, why, if species have descended from other species by insensibly fine gradations, do we not everywhere see innumerable transitional forms? Why is not all nature in confusion instead of the species being, as we see them, well defined?

— On the Origin of Species (1859), chapter 6

This dilemma can be described as the absence or rarity of transitional varieties in habitat space.

Another dilemma, related to the first one, is the absence or rarity of transitional varieties in time. Darwin pointed out that by the theory of natural selection "innumerable transitional forms must have existed", and wondered "why do we not find them embedded in countless numbers in the crust of the earth". That clearly defined species actually do exist in nature in both space and time implies that some fundamental feature of natural selection operates to generate and maintain species.

=== Effect of sexual reproduction on species formation ===
It has been argued that the resolution of Darwin's first dilemma lies in the fact that out-crossing sexual reproduction has an intrinsic cost of rarity. The cost of rarity arises as follows. If, on a resource gradient, a large number of separate species evolve, each exquisitely adapted to a very narrow band on that gradient, each species will, of necessity, consist of very few members. Finding a mate under these circumstances may present difficulties when many of the individuals in the neighborhood belong to other species. Under these circumstances, if any species' population size happens, by chance, to increase (at the expense of one or other of its neighboring species, if the environment is saturated), this will immediately make it easier for its members to find sexual partners. The members of the neighboring species, whose population sizes have decreased, experience greater difficulty in finding mates, and therefore form pairs less frequently than the larger species. This has a snowball effect, with large species growing at the expense of the smaller, rarer species, eventually driving them to extinction. Eventually, only a few species remain, each distinctly different from the other. Rarity not only imposes the risk of failure to find a mate, but it may also incur indirect costs, such as the resources expended or risks taken to seek out a partner at low population densities.

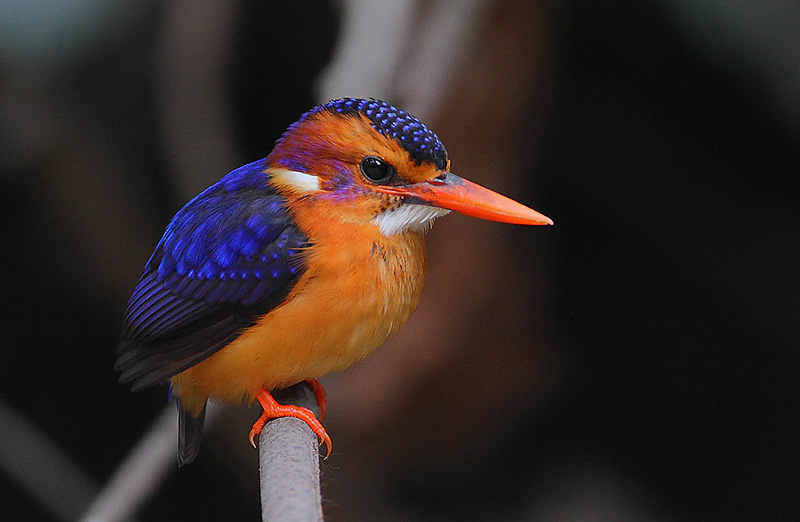
African pygmy kingfisher, showing coloration shared by all adults of that species to a high degree of fidelity.

Rarity brings with it other costs. Rare and unusual features are very seldom advantageous. In most instances, they indicate a (non-silent) mutation, which is almost certain to be deleterious. It therefore behooves sexual creatures to avoid mates sporting rare or unusual features (koinophilia). Sexual populations therefore rapidly shed rare or peripheral phenotypic features, thus canalizing the entire external appearance, as illustrated in the accompanying image of the African pygmy kingfisher, Ispidina picta. This uniformity of all the adult members of a sexual species has stimulated the proliferation of field guides on birds, mammals, reptiles, insects, and many other taxa, in which a species can be described with a single illustration (or two, in the case of sexual dimorphism). Once a population has become as homogeneous in appearance as is typical of most species (and is illustrated in the photograph of the African pygmy kingfisher), its members will avoid mating with members of other populations that look different from themselves. Thus, the avoidance of mates displaying rare and unusual phenotypic features inevitably leads to reproductive isolation, one of the hallmarks of speciation.

In the contrasting case of organisms that reproduce asexually, there is no cost of rarity; consequently, there are only benefits to fine-scale adaptation. Thus, asexual organisms very frequently show the continuous variation in form (often in many different directions) that Darwin expected evolution to produce, making their classification into "species" (more correctly, morphospecies) very difficult.

== Modes ==
Comparison of allopatric, peripatric, parapatric and sympatric speciation

All forms of natural speciation have taken place over the course of evolution; however, debate persists as to the relative importance of each mechanism in driving biodiversity.

One example of natural speciation is the diversity of the three-spined stickleback, a marine fish that, after the last glacial period, has undergone speciation into new freshwater colonies in isolated lakes and streams. Over an estimated 10,000 generations, the sticklebacks show structural differences that are greater than those seen between different genera of fish including variations in fins, changes in the number or size of their bony plates, variable jaw structure, and color differences.

=== Allopatric ===
During allopatric (from the ancient Greek allos, "other" + patrā, "fatherland") speciation, a population splits into two geographically isolated populations (for example, by habitat fragmentation due to geographical change such as mountain formation). The isolated populations then undergo genotypic or phenotypic divergence as: (a) they become subjected to dissimilar selective pressures; (b) different mutations arise in the two populations. When the populations come back into contact, they have evolved such that they are reproductively isolated and are no longer capable of exchanging genes. Island genetics is the term associated with the tendency of small, isolated genetic pools to produce unusual traits. Examples include insular dwarfism and the radical changes among certain famous island chains, for example on Komodo. The Galápagos Islands are particularly famous for their influence on Charles Darwin. During his five weeks there he heard that Galápagos tortoises could be identified by island, and noticed that finches differed from one island to another, but it was only nine months later that he speculated that such facts could show that species were changeable. When he returned to England, his speculation on evolution deepened after experts informed him that these were separate species, not just varieties, and famously that other differing Galápagos birds were all species of finches. Though the finches were less important for Darwin, more recent research has shown the birds now known as Darwin's finches to be a classic case of adaptive evolutionary radiation.

=== Peripatric ===
In peripatric speciation, a subform of allopatric speciation, new species are formed in isolated, smaller peripheral populations that are prevented from exchanging genes with the main population. It is related to the concept of a founder effect, since small populations often undergo bottlenecks. Genetic drift is often proposed to play a significant role in peripatric speciation.

Case studies include Ernst Mayr's investigation of bird fauna; the Australian bird Petroica multicolor; and reproductive isolation in populations of Drosophila subject to population bottlenecking.

=== Parapatric ===
In parapatric speciation, there is only partial separation of the zones of two diverging populations afforded by geography; individuals of each species may come in contact or cross habitats from time to time, but reduced fitness of the heterozygote leads to selection for behaviours or mechanisms that prevent their interbreeding. Parapatric speciation is modelled on continuous variation within a "single", connected habitat acting as a source of natural selection rather than the effects of isolation of habitats produced in peripatric and allopatric speciation.

Parapatric speciation may be associated with differential landscape-dependent selection. Even if there is a gene flow between two populations, strong differential selection may impede assimilation and different species may eventually develop. Habitat differences may be more important in the development of reproductive isolation than the isolation time. Caucasian rock lizards Darevskia rudis, D. valentini and D. portschinskii all hybridize with each other in their hybrid zone; however, hybridization is stronger between D. portschinskii and D. rudis, which separated earlier but live in similar habitats than between D. valentini and the two other species, which separated later but live in climatically different habitats.

Ecologists refer to parapatric and peripatric speciation in terms of ecological niches. A niche must be available in order for a new species to be successful. Ring species such as Larus gulls have been claimed to illustrate speciation in progress, though the situation may be more complex. The grass Anthoxanthum odoratum may be starting parapatric speciation in areas of mine contamination.

=== Sympatric ===
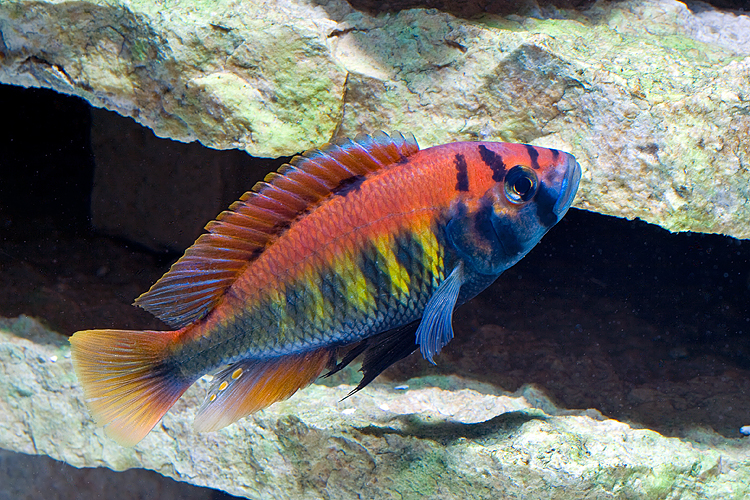
Cichlids such as Haplochromis nyererei diversified by sympatric speciation in the Rift Valley lakes.

Sympatric speciation is the formation of two or more descendant species from a single ancestral species all occupying the same geographic location.

Often-cited examples of sympatric speciation are found in insects that become dependent on different host plants in the same area.

The best known example of sympatric speciation is that of the cichlids of East Africa inhabiting the Rift Valley lakes, particularly Lake Victoria, Lake Malawi and Lake Tanganyika. There are over 800 described species, and according to estimates, there could be well over 1,600 species in the region. Their evolution is cited as an example of both natural and sexual selection. A 2008 study suggests that sympatric speciation has occurred in Tennessee cave salamanders. Sympatric speciation driven by ecological factors may also account for the extraordinary diversity of crustaceans living in the depths of Siberia's Lake Baikal.

Budding speciation has been proposed as a particular form of sympatric speciation, whereby small groups of individuals become progressively more isolated from the ancestral stock by breeding preferentially with one another. This type of speciation would be driven by the conjunction of various advantages of inbreeding such as the expression of advantageous recessive phenotypes, reducing the recombination load, and reducing the cost of sex.

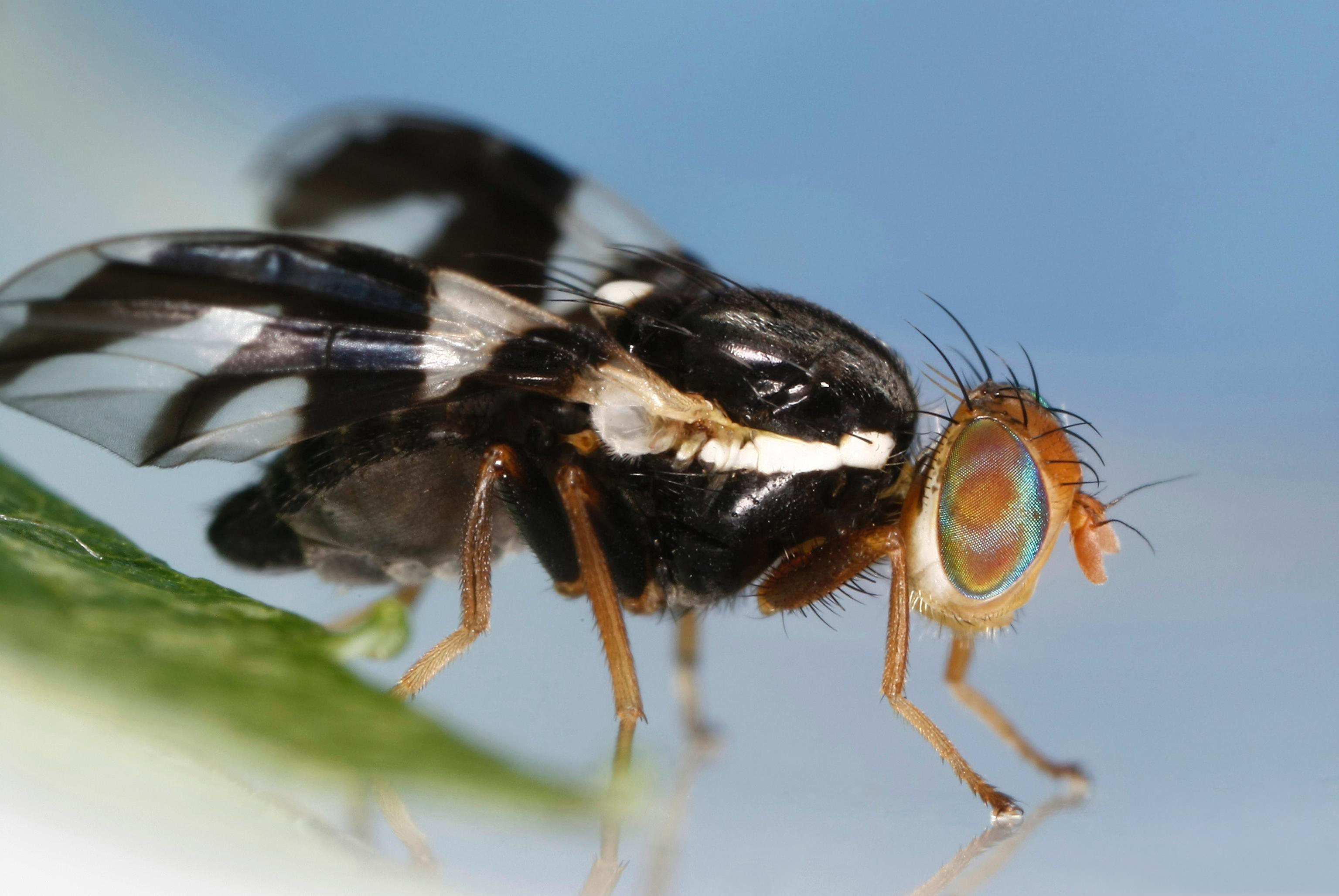
Rhagoletis pomonella, the hawthorn fly, appears to be in the process of sympatric speciation.

The hawthorn fly (Rhagoletis pomonella), also known as the apple maggot fly, appears to be undergoing sympatric speciation. Different populations of hawthorn fly feed on different fruits. A distinct population emerged in North America in the 19th century some time after apples, a non-native species, were introduced. This apple-feeding population normally feeds only on apples and not on the historically preferred fruit of hawthorns. The current hawthorn feeding population does not normally feed on apples. Some evidence, such as that six out of thirteen allozyme loci are different, that hawthorn flies mature later in the season and take longer to mature than apple flies; and that there is little evidence of interbreeding (researchers have documented a 4–6% hybridization rate) suggests that sympatric speciation is occurring.

== Methods of selection ==
=== Reinforcement ===
Reinforcement assists speciation by selecting against hybrids.

Reinforcement, also called the Wallace effect, is the process by which natural selection increases reproductive isolation. It may occur after two populations of the same species are separated and then come back into contact. If their reproductive isolation was complete, then they will have already developed into two separate incompatible species. If their reproductive isolation is incomplete, then further mating between the populations will produce hybrids, which may or may not be fertile. If the hybrids are infertile, or fertile but less fit than their ancestors, then there will be further reproductive isolation and speciation has essentially occurred, as in horses and donkeys.

One reasoning behind this is that if the parents of the hybrid offspring each have naturally selected traits for their own certain environments, the hybrid offspring will bear traits from both, therefore would not fit either ecological niche as well as either parent (ecological speciation). The low fitness of the hybrids would cause selection to favor assortative mating, which would control hybridization. This is sometimes called the Wallace effect after the evolutionary biologist Alfred Russel Wallace who suggested in the late 19th century that it might be an important factor in speciation. Conversely, if the hybrid offspring are more fit than their ancestors, then the populations will merge back into the same species within the area they are in contact.

Another important theoretical mechanism is the arise of intrinsic genetic incompatibilities, addressed in the Bateson-Dobzhansky-Muller model. Genes from allopatric populations will have different evolutionary backgrounds and are never tested together until hybridization at secondary contact, when negative epistatic interactions will be exposed. In other words, new alleles will emerge in a population and only pass through selection if they work well together with other genes in the same population, but it may not be compatible with genes in an allopatric population, be those other newly derived alleles or retained ancestral alleles. This is only revealed through new hybridization. Such incompatibilities cause lower fitness in hybrids regardless of the ecological environment, and are thus intrinsic, although they can originate from the adaptation to different environments. The accumulation of such incompatibilities increases faster and faster with time, creating a "snowball" effect. There is a large amount of evidence supporting this theory, primarily from laboratory populations such as Drosophila and Mus, and some genes involved in incompatibilities have been identified.

Reinforcement favoring reproductive isolation is required for both parapatric and sympatric speciation. Without reinforcement, the geographic area of contact between different forms of the same species, called their "hybrid zone", will not develop into a boundary between the different species. Hybrid zones are regions where diverged populations meet and interbreed. Hybrid offspring are common in these regions, which are usually created by diverged species coming into secondary contact. Without reinforcement, the two species would have uncontrollable inbreeding. Reinforcement may be induced in artificial selection experiments as described below.

=== Ecological ===
Ecological selection is "the interaction of individuals with their environment during resource acquisition". Natural selection is inherently involved in the process of speciation, whereby, "under ecological speciation, populations in different environments, or populations exploiting different resources, experience contrasting natural selection pressures on the traits that directly or indirectly bring about the evolution of reproductive isolation". Evidence for the role ecology plays in the process of speciation exists. Studies of stickleback populations support ecologically linked speciation arising as a by-product, alongside numerous studies of parallel speciation, where isolation evolves between independent populations of species adapting to contrasting environments than between independent populations adapting to similar environments. Ecological speciation occurs with much of the evidence, "...accumulated from top-down studies of adaptation and reproductive isolation".

=== Sexual selection ===
Sexual selection can drive speciation in a clade, independently of natural selection. However the term "speciation", in this context, tends to be used in two different, but not mutually exclusive senses. The first and most commonly used sense refers to the "birth" of new species. That is, the splitting of an existing species into two separate species, or the budding off of a new species from a parent species, both driven by a biological "fashion fad" (a preference for a feature, or features, in one or both sexes, that do not necessarily have any adaptive qualities). In the second sense, "speciation" refers to the wide-spread tendency of sexual creatures to be grouped into clearly defined species, rather than forming a continuum of phenotypes both in time and space – which would be the more obvious or logical consequence of natural selection. This was indeed recognized by Darwin as problematic, and included in his On the Origin of Species (1859), under the heading "Difficulties with the Theory". There are several suggestions as to how mate choice might play a significant role in resolving Darwin's dilemma. If speciation takes place in the absence of natural selection, it might be referred to as nonecological speciation.

== Artificial speciation ==
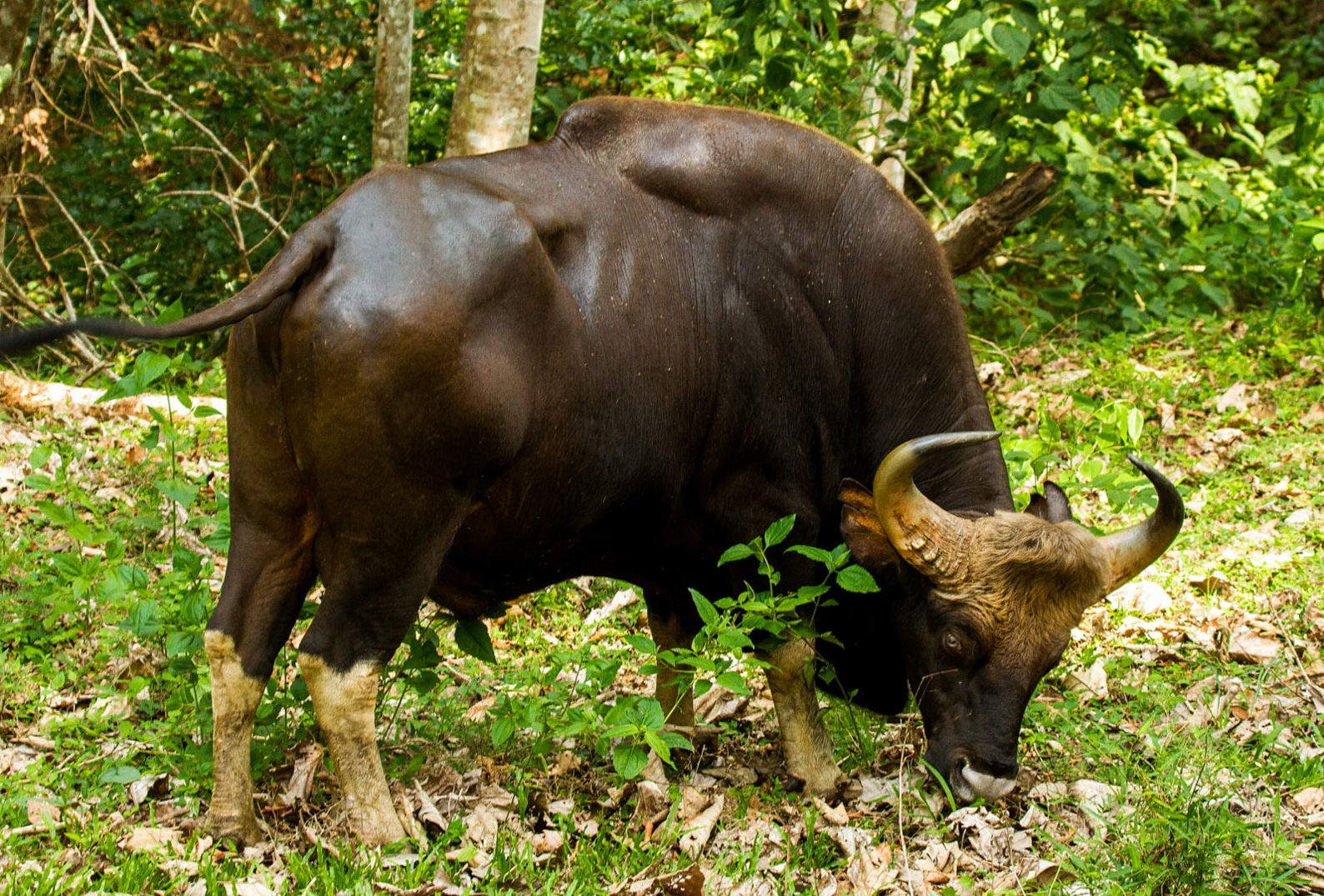
Gaur (Indian bison) can interbreed with domestic cattle.

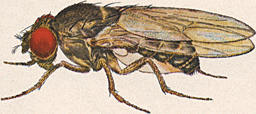
Male Drosophila pseudoobscura

New species have been created by animal husbandry, but the dates and methods of the initiation of such species are not clear. Often, the domestic counterpart can still interbreed and produce fertile offspring with its wild ancestor. This is the case with domestic cattle, which can be considered the same species as several varieties of wild ox, gaur, and yak; and with domestic sheep that can interbreed with the mouflon.

The best-documented creations of new species in the laboratory were performed in the late 1980s. William R. Rice and George W. Salt bred Drosophila melanogaster fruit flies using a maze with three different choices of habitat such as light/dark and wet/dry. Each generation was placed into the maze, and the groups of flies that came out of two of the eight exits were set apart to breed with each other in their respective groups. After thirty-five generations, the two groups and their offspring were isolated reproductively because of their strong habitat preferences: they mated only within the areas they preferred, and so did not mate with flies that preferred the other areas. The history of such attempts is described by Rice and Elen E. Hostert (1993). Diane Dodd used a laboratory experiment to show how reproductive isolation can develop in Drosophila pseudoobscura fruit flies after several generations by placing them in different media, starch- and maltose-based media.

Dodd's experiment has been replicated many times, including with other kinds of fruit flies and foods. Such rapid evolution of reproductive isolation may sometimes be a relic of infection by Wolbachia bacteria.

An alternative explanation is that these observations are consistent with sexually-reproducing animals being inherently reluctant to mate with individuals whose appearance or behavior is different from the norm. The risk that such deviations are due to heritable maladaptations is high. Thus, if an animal, unable to predict natural selection's future direction, is conditioned to produce the fittest offspring possible, it will avoid mates with unusual habits or features. Sexual creatures then inevitably group themselves into reproductively isolated species.

== Genetics ==
=== Species barriers ===
In evolutionary biology, a species barrier is any genetic difference that reduces gene flow between diverging lineages. In Darwin's framework, natural selection acting in heterogeneous environments drives phenotypic divergence; hybrids with intermediate phenotypes may suffer reduced fitness where parental populations are locally adapted. The genetic basis of such barriers was first mapped using crosses between closely related species; for example, Dobzhansky showed in Drosophila that some chromosomal regions contribute disproportionately to hybrid sterility, establishing that reproductive isolation has a genomic basis rather than a single-locus cause.

These findings motivated the Dobzhansky–Muller model: hybrid dysfunction arises from negative epistasis between derived alleles that evolved separately in each lineage, without either lineage having to cross a low-fitness state. Subsequent theory formalized how selected loci impede introgression at nearby neutral loci, quantifying the "barrier to gene flow" and showing that many loci are typically required to strongly reduce exchange across most of the genome. In parallel, the "genic view" of speciation argued that differentiation and isolation often begin at a subset of loci under divergent or sexual selection, while the remainder of the genome can remain permeable for long periods.

=== Accumulation of species barriers ===
Experimental crosses across clades show that overall postzygotic isolation increases with genetic divergence, but the architecture is typically polygenic, asymmetric, and often involves complex (≥3-locus) Dobzhansky–Muller incompatibilities. Theory predicts different accumulation dynamics: under the classic "snowball" model, the number of pairwise incompatibilities grows roughly with the square of substitutions, whereas alternative models (e.g. Fisher's geometric model) can yield more linear behavior depending on trait architecture and selection.

Because barrier loci impede nearby introgression, genomes of diverging lineages often become mosaics with semipermeable regions during "semi-isolated" stages; linkage disequilibria and parallel clines in hybrid zones provide estimates of selection and dispersal maintaining such barriers. Population-genomic inference now makes it possible to quantify how gene flow declines with molecular divergence and to identify when genomic heterogeneity of introgression arises, thereby enabling cross-taxon comparisons along the speciation continuum to uncover the factors driving the accumulation of species barriers.

Few speciation genes have been found. They usually involve the reinforcement process of late stages of speciation. In 2008, a speciation gene causing reproductive isolation was reported. It causes hybrid sterility between related subspecies. The order of speciation of three groups from a common ancestor may be unclear or unknown; a collection of three such species is referred to as a "trichotomy".

=== Speciation via polyploidy ===
Speciation via polyploidy: A diploid cell undergoes failed meiosis, producing diploid gametes, which self-fertilize to produce a tetraploid zygote. In plants, this can effectively be a new species, reproductively isolated from its parents, and able to reproduce.

Polyploidy is a mechanism that has caused many rapid speciation events in sympatry because offspring of, for example, tetraploid x diploid matings often result in triploid sterile progeny. However, among plants, not all polyploids are reproductively isolated from their parents, and gene flow may still occur, such as through triploid hybrid x diploid matings that produce tetraploids, or matings between meiotically unreduced gametes from diploids and gametes from tetraploids (see also hybrid speciation).

It has been suggested that many of the existing plant and most animal species have undergone an event of polyploidization in their evolutionary history. Reproduction of successful polyploid species is sometimes asexual, by parthenogenesis or apomixis, as for unknown reasons many asexual organisms are polyploid. Rare instances of polyploid mammals are known, but most often result in prenatal death.

=== Hybrid speciation ===
Hybridization between two different species sometimes leads to a distinct phenotype. This phenotype can also be fitter than the parental lineage and as such natural selection may then favor these individuals. Eventually, if reproductive isolation is achieved, it may lead to a separate species. However, reproductive isolation between hybrids and their parents is particularly difficult to achieve and thus hybrid speciation is considered an extremely rare event. The Mariana mallard is thought to have arisen from hybrid speciation.

Hybridization is an important means of speciation in plants, since polyploidy (having more than two copies of each chromosome) is tolerated in plants more readily than in animals. Polyploidy is important in hybrids as it allows reproduction, with the two different sets of chromosomes each being able to pair with an identical partner during meiosis. Polyploids also have more genetic diversity, which allows them to avoid inbreeding depression in small populations.

Hybridization without change in chromosome number is called homoploid hybrid speciation. It is considered very rare but has been shown in Heliconius butterflies and sunflowers. Polyploid speciation, which involves changes in chromosome number, is a more common phenomenon in plant species.

=== Gene transposition ===
Theodosius Dobzhansky, who studied fruit flies in the early days of genetic research in the 1930s, speculated that parts of chromosomes that switch from one location to another might cause a species to split into two different species. He mapped out how it might be possible for sections of chromosomes to relocate themselves in a genome. Those mobile sections can cause sterility in inter-species hybrids, which can act as a speciation pressure. In theory, his idea was sound, but scientists long debated whether it actually happened in nature. Eventually a competing theory involving the gradual accumulation of mutations was shown to occur in nature so often that geneticists largely dismissed the moving gene hypothesis. However, 2006 research shows that jumping of a gene from one chromosome to another can contribute to the birth of new species. This validates the reproductive isolation mechanism, a key component of speciation.

== Rates ==
Phyletic gradualism, above, consists of relatively slow change over geological time. Punctuated equilibrium, bottom, consists of morphological stability and rare, relatively rapid bursts of evolutionary change.

There is debate as to the rate at which speciation events occur over geologic time. While some evolutionary biologists claim that speciation events have remained relatively constant and gradual over time (known as "Phyletic gradualism" – see diagram), some palaeontologists such as Niles Eldredge and Stephen Jay Gould have argued that species usually remain unchanged over long stretches of time, and that speciation occurs only over relatively brief intervals, a view known as punctuated equilibrium. (See diagram, and Darwin's dilemma.)

=== Punctuated evolution ===
Evolution can be extremely rapid, as shown in the creation of domesticated animals and plants in a very short geological space of time, spanning only a few tens of thousands of years. Maize (Zea mays), for instance, was created in Mexico in only a few thousand years, starting about 7,000 to 12,000 years ago. This raises the question of why the long term rate of evolution is far slower than is theoretically possible.

Plants and domestic animals can differ markedly from their wild ancestors

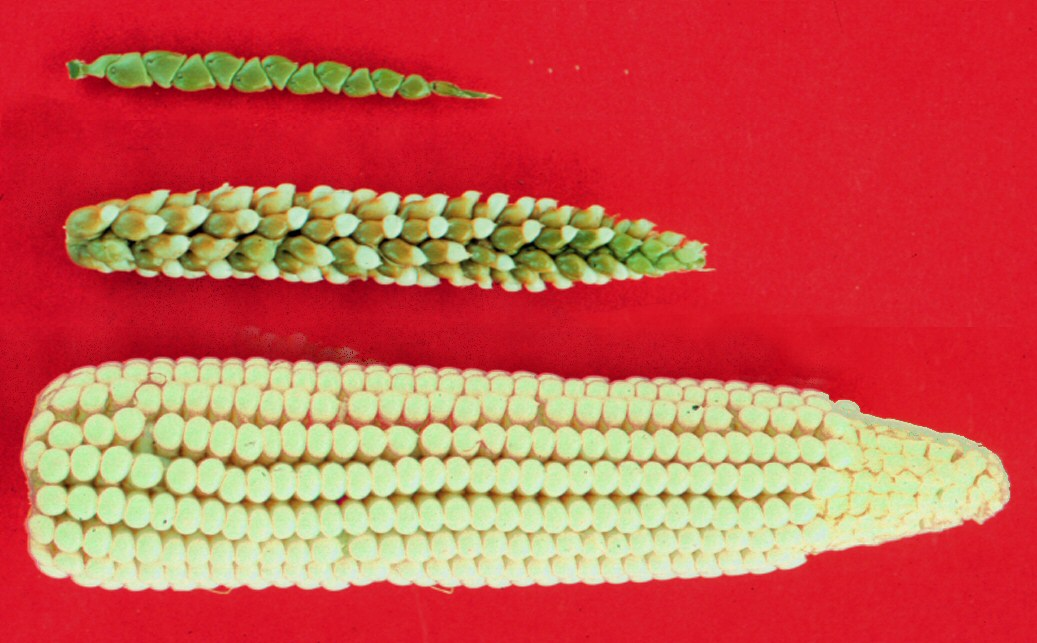
Top: wild teosinte; middle: maize-teosinte hybrid; bottom: maize

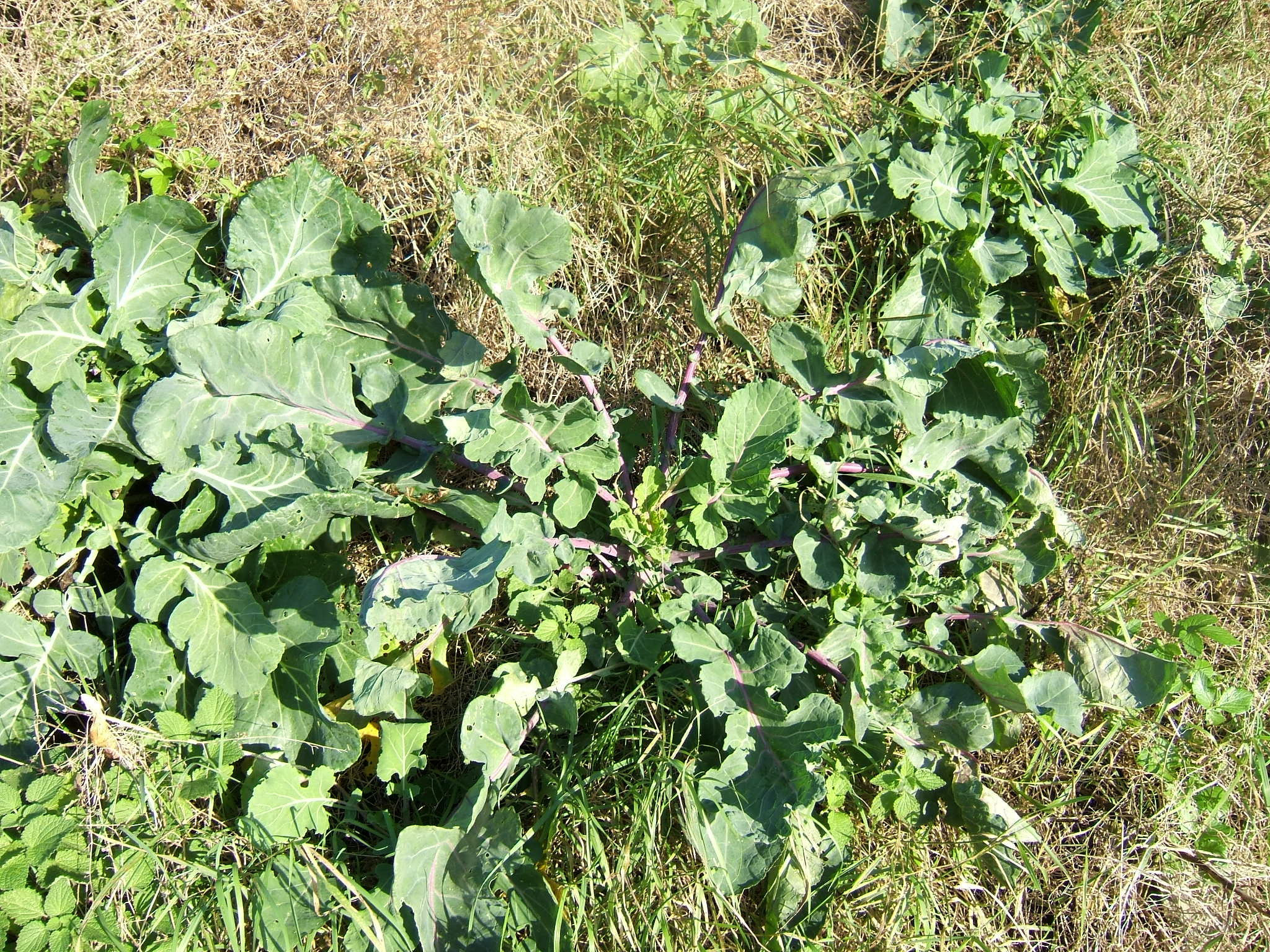
Ancestral wild cabbage

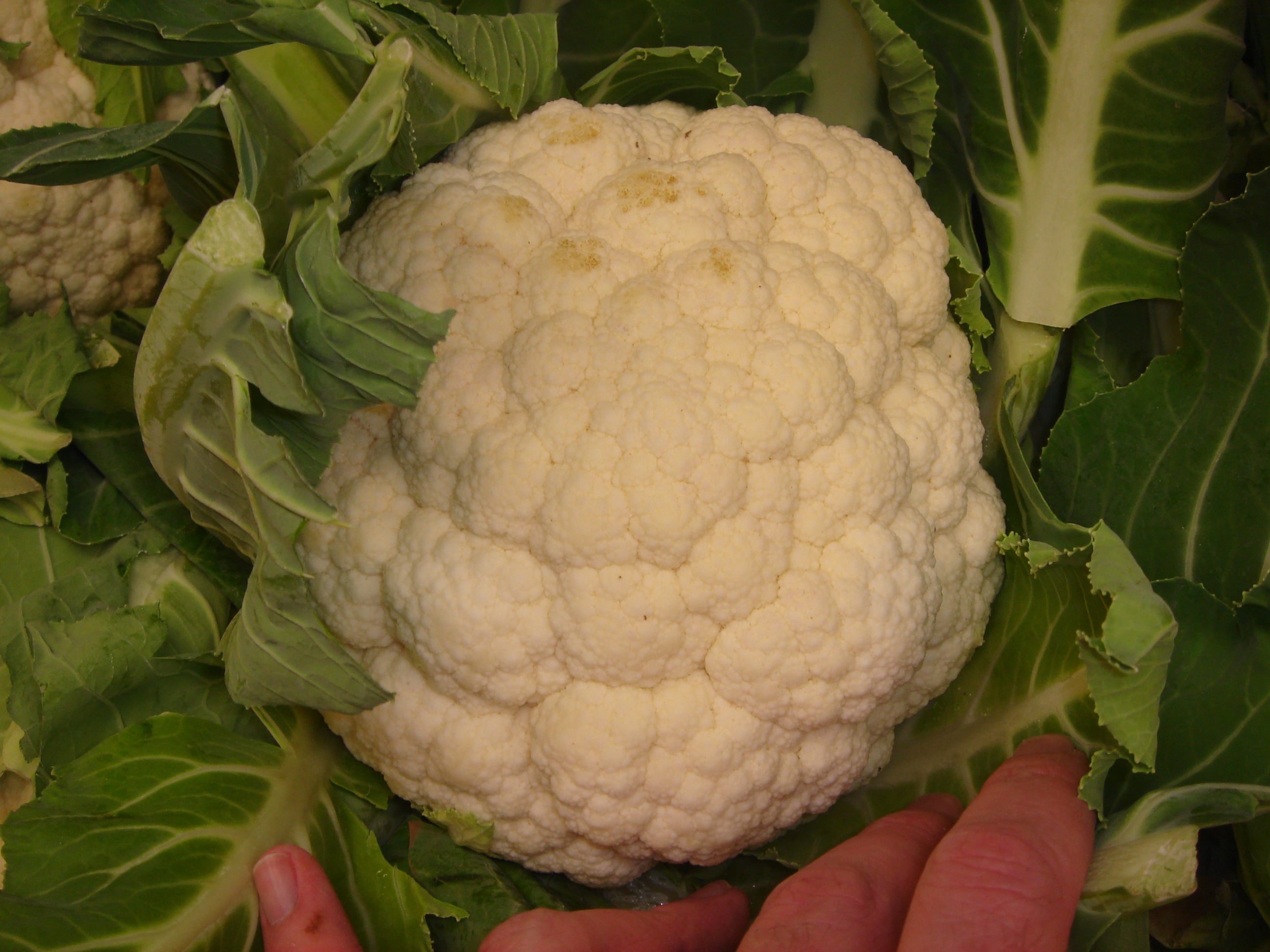
Domesticated cauliflower

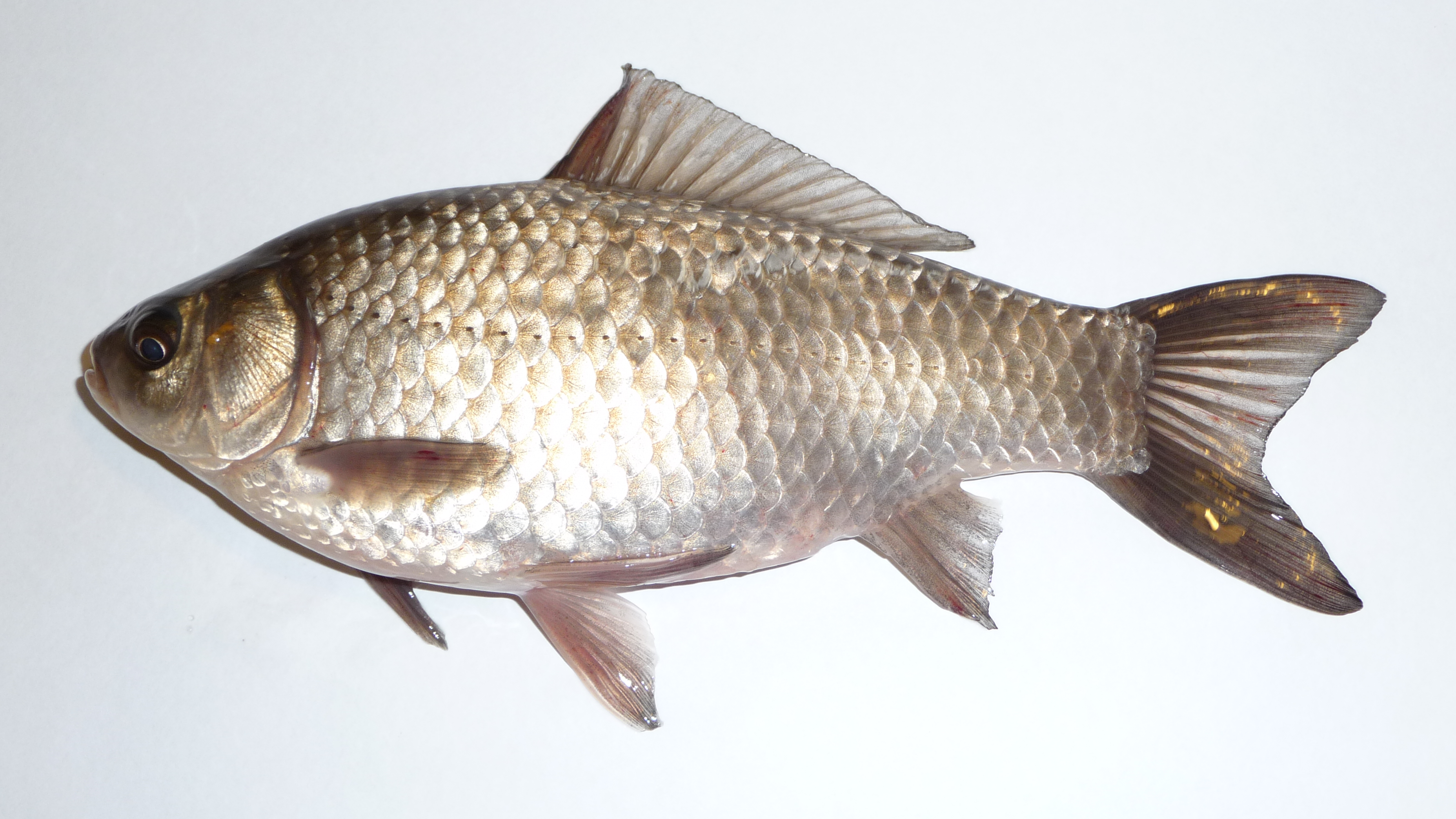
Ancestral Prussian carp

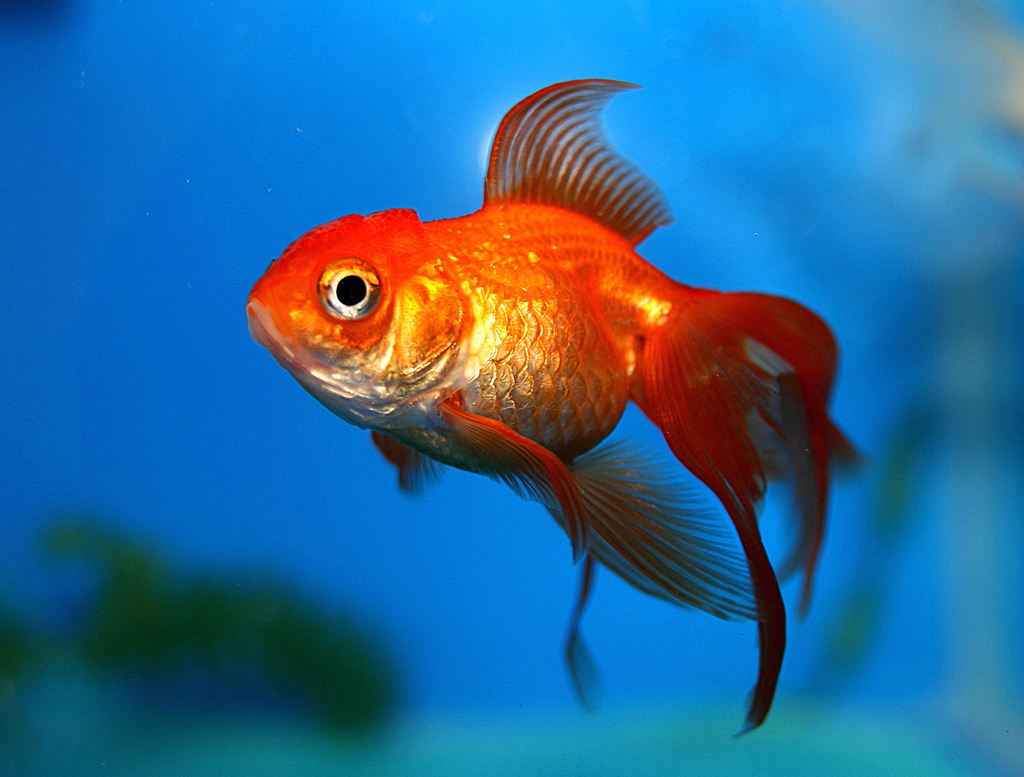
Domestic goldfish

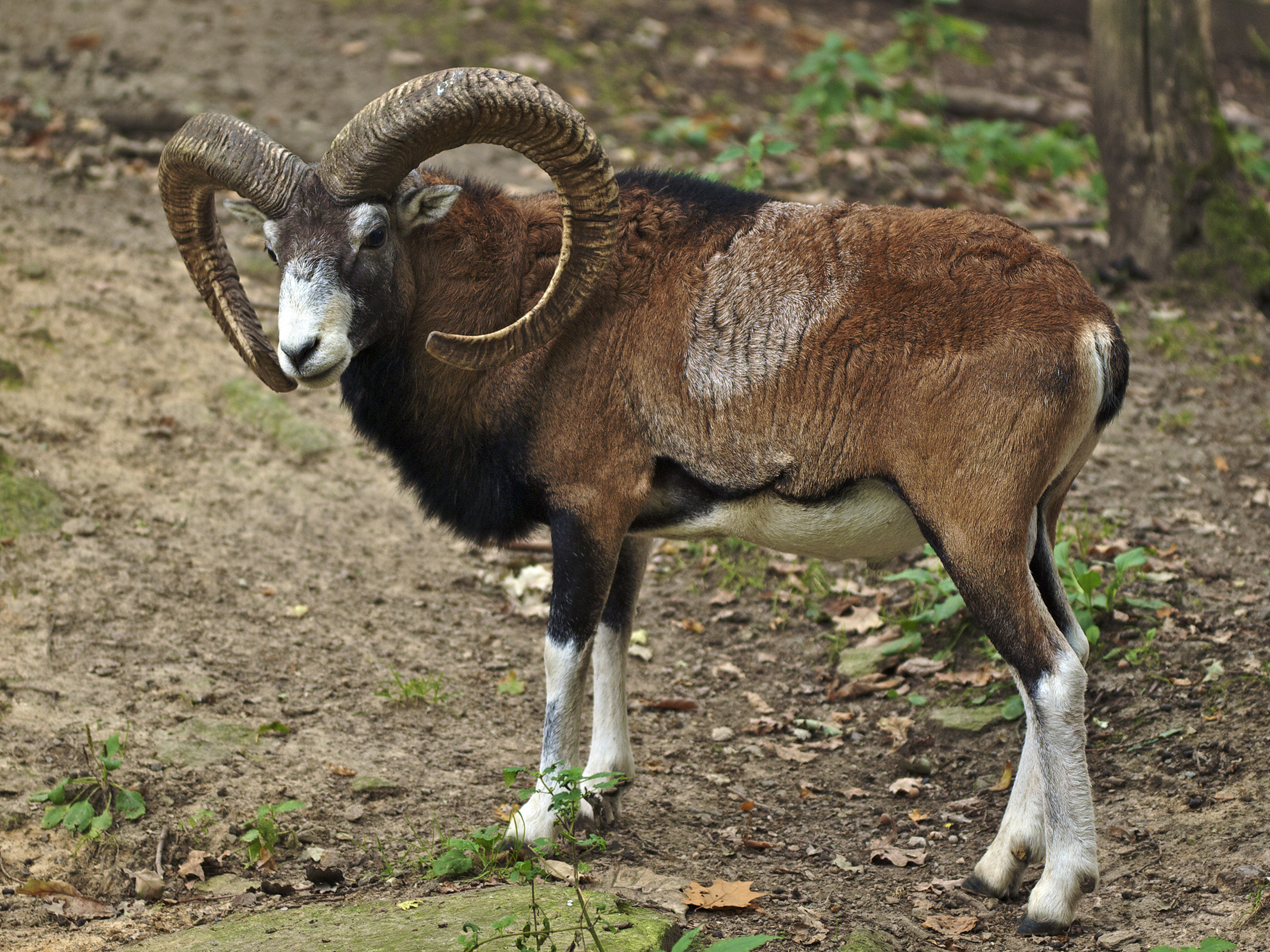
Ancestral mouflon

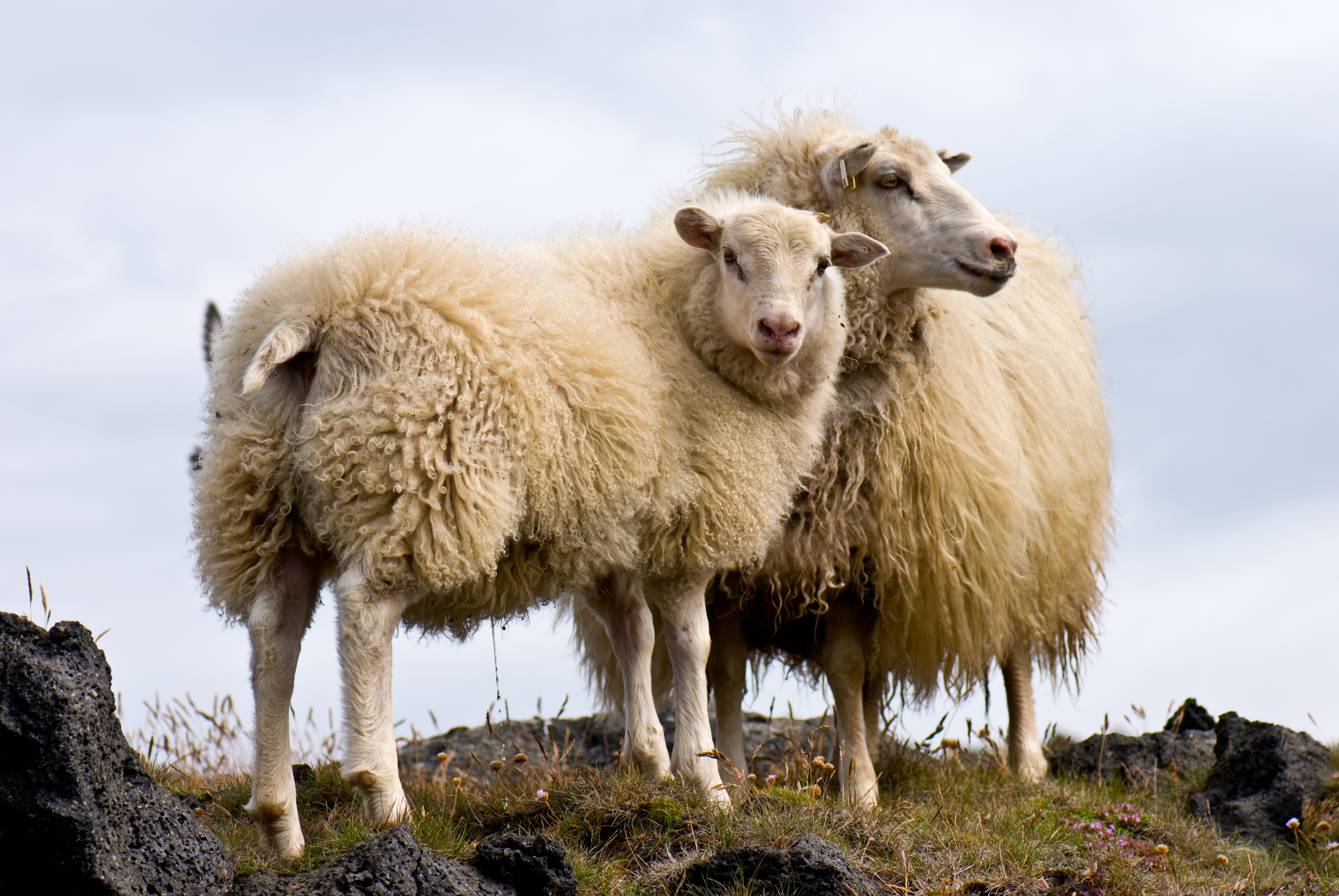
Domestic sheep

Evolution is imposed on species or groups. It is not planned or striven for in some Lamarckist way. The mutations on which the process depends are random events, and, except for the "silent mutations" which do not affect the functionality or appearance of the carrier, are thus usually disadvantageous, and their chance of proving to be useful in the future is vanishingly small. Therefore, while a species or group might benefit from being able to adapt to a new environment by accumulating a wide range of genetic variation, this is to the detriment of the individuals who have to carry these mutations until a small, unpredictable minority of them ultimately contributes to such an adaptation. Thus, the capability to evolve would require group selection, a concept discredited by (for example) George C. Williams, John Maynard Smith and Richard Dawkins as selectively disadvantageous to the individual.

The resolution to Darwin's second dilemma might thus come about as follows:

If sexual individuals are disadvantaged by passing mutations on to their offspring, they will avoid mutant mates with strange or unusual characteristics. Mutations that affect the external appearance of their carriers will then rarely be passed on to the next and subsequent generations. They would therefore seldom be tested by natural selection. Evolution is, therefore, effectively halted or slowed down considerably. The only mutations that can accumulate in a population, on this punctuated equilibrium view, are ones that have no noticeable effect on the outward appearance and functionality of their bearers (i.e., they are "silent" or "neutral mutations", which can be, and are, used to trace the relatedness and age of populations and species.)

This argument implies that evolution can only occur if mutant mates cannot be avoided, as a result of a severe scarcity of potential mates. This is most likely to occur in small, isolated communities. These occur most commonly on small islands, in remote valleys, lakes, river systems, or caves, or during the aftermath of a mass extinction. Under these circumstances, not only is the choice of mates severely restricted but population bottlenecks, founder effects, genetic drift and inbreeding cause rapid, random changes in the isolated population's genetic composition. Furthermore, hybridization with a related species trapped in the same isolate might introduce additional genetic changes. If an isolated population such as this survives its genetic upheavals, and subsequently expands into an unoccupied niche, or into a niche in which it has an advantage over its competitors, a new species, or subspecies, will have come into being. In geological terms, this will be an abrupt event. A resumption of avoiding mutant mates will thereafter result, once again, in evolutionary stagnation.

In apparent confirmation of this punctuated equilibrium view of evolution, the fossil record of an evolutionary progression typically consists of species that suddenly appear, and ultimately disappear, hundreds of thousands or millions of years later, without any change in external appearance. Graphically, these fossil species are represented by lines parallel with the time axis, whose lengths depict how long each of them existed. The fact that the lines remain parallel with the time axis illustrates the unchanging appearance of each of the fossil species depicted on the graph. During each species' existence new species appear at random intervals, each also lasting many hundreds of thousands of years before disappearing without a change in appearance. The exact relatedness of these concurrent species is generally impossible to determine. This is illustrated in the diagram depicting the distribution of hominin species through time since the hominins separated from the line that led to the evolution of their closest living primate relatives, the chimpanzees.

For similar evolutionary time lines see, for instance, the paleontological list of African dinosaurs, Asian dinosaurs, the Lampriformes and Amiiformes.

== See also ==
- Bateson–Dobzhansky–Muller model
- Court jester hypothesis
- Macroevolution
- Selection (genetic algorithm)
- Species problem
- Adaptive radiation
- Ecotype
- Polymorphism
- Chronospecies
- Sympatric speciation
- Parapatric speciation
- Evidence for speciation by reinforcement
- Most recent common ancestor
- Hybrid speciation

== Bibliography ==
- Ayala, Francisco J. (1982). Population and Evolutionary Genetics. Benjamin/Cummings Series in the Life Sciences. Menlo Park, CA: Benjamin/Cummings Pub. Co. ISBN 978-0-8053-0315-5. LCCN 81021623. OCLC 8034790.
- Berlocher, Stewart H. (1998). "Origins: A Brief History of Research on Speciation". In Howard, Daniel J.; Berlocher, Stewart H. (eds.). Endless Forms: Species and Speciation. New York: Oxford University Press. ISBN 978-0-19-510901-6. LCCN 97031461. OCLC 37545522.
- Bernstein, Carol; Bernstein, Harris (1991). Aging, Sex, and DNA Repair. San Diego, CA: Academic Press. ISBN 978-0-12-092860-6. LCCN 90014467. OCLC 22542921.
- Campbell, Neil A. (1990). Biology (2nd ed.). Redwood City, CA: Benjamin/Cummings Pub. Co. ISBN 978-0-8053-1800-5. LCCN 89017952. OCLC 20352649.
- Clapham, Arthur Roy; Tutin, Thomas G.; Warburg, Edmund F. (1952). Flora of the British Isles. Cambridge, UK: Cambridge University Press. LCCN 52008880. OCLC 1084058.
- Coyne, Jerry A.; Orr, H. Allen (2004). Speciation. Sunderlands, MA: Sinauer Associates. ISBN 978-0-87893-089-0. LCCN 2004009505. OCLC 55078441.
- Darwin, Charles (1859). On the Origin of Species by Means of Natural Selection, or the Preservation of Favoured Races in the Struggle for Life (1st ed.). London: John Murray. LCCN 06017473. OCLC 741260650. The book is available from John van Wyhe, ed. (2002), The Complete Work of Charles Darwin Online.
- Dawkins, Richard (1995). River Out of Eden: A Darwinian View of Life. Science Masters Series. New York: Basic Books. ISBN 978-0-465-01606-8. LCCN 94037146. OCLC 31376584.
- Eldredge, Niles; Gould, Stephen Jay (1972). "Punctuated Equilibria: An Alternative to Phyletic Gradualism". In Schopf, Thomas J. M. (ed.). Models in Paleobiology. San Francisco, CA: Freeman Cooper & Co. ISBN 978-0-87735-325-6. LCCN 72078387. OCLC 572084. Reprinted in Eldredge 1985, pp. 193–223
- Eldredge, Niles (1985). Time Frames: The Rethinking of Darwinian Evolution and the Theory of Punctuated Equilibria. New York: Simon & Schuster. ISBN 978-0-671-49555-8. LCCN 84023632. OCLC 11443805.
- Endler, John A. (1977). Geographic Variation, Speciation, and Clines. Monographs in Population Biology. Vol. 10. Princeton, NJ: Princeton University Press. pp. 1–246. ISBN 978-0-691-08187-8. LCCN 76045896. OCLC 2645720. PMID 409931.
- Gould, Stephen Jay (1980). The Panda's Thumb: More Reflections in Natural History (1st ed.). New York: W. W. Norton & Company. ISBN 978-0-393-01380-1. LCCN 80015952. OCLC 6331415. 1982 edition via Internet Archive.
- Grant, Verne (1971). Plant Speciation. New York: Columbia University Press. ISBN 978-0-231-03208-7. LCCN 75125620. OCLC 139834.
- Hockey, Phil A. R.; Dean, W. Richard J.; Ryan, Peter G., eds. (2005). Roberts Birds of Southern Africa (7th ed.). Cape Town, South Africa: Trustees of the J. Voelcker Bird Book Fund. ISBN 978-0-620-34053-3. LCCN 2006376728. OCLC 65978899.
- Laws, Bill (2010). Fifty Plants that Changed the Course of History. Buffalo, NY: Firefly Books. ISBN 978-1-55407-798-4. LCCN 2011414731. OCLC 711609823.
- Maynard Smith, John (1989). Evolutionary Genetics. Oxford; New York: Oxford University Press. ISBN 978-0-19-854215-5. LCCN 88017041. OCLC 18069049.
- Mayr, Ernst (1954). "Change of Genetic Environment and Evolution". In Huxley, Julian; Hardy, Alister C.; Ford, Edmund B. (eds.). Evolution as a Process. London: Allen & Unwin. LCCN 54001781. OCLC 974739.
- Mayr, Ernst (1982). The Growth of Biological Thought: Diversity, Evolution, and Inheritance. Cambridge, Massachusetts: Belknap Press of Harvard University Press. ISBN 978-0-674-36445-5. LCCN 81013204. OCLC 7875904.
- Mayr, Ernst (1988). Toward a New Philosophy of Biology: Observations of an Evolutionist. Cambridge, Massachusetts: Belknap Press of Harvard University Press. ISBN 978-0-674-89665-9. LCCN 87031892. OCLC 17108004.
- Mayr, Ernst (1992). "Speciational Evolution or Punctuated Equilibrium". In Somit, Albert; Peterson, Steven A. (eds.). Dynamics of Evolution: The Punctuated Equilibrium Debate in the Natural and Social Sciences. Ithaca, NY: Cornell University Press. ISBN 978-0-8014-9763-6. LCCN 91055569. OCLC 24374091.
- McCarthy, Terence; Rubidge, Bruce (2005). The Story of Earth & Life: A Southern African Perspective on a 4.6-Billion-Year Journey. Cape Town, South Africa: Struik Publishers. ISBN 978-1-77007-148-3. LCCN 2006376206. OCLC 62098231.
- Michod, Richard E. (1995). Eros and Evolution: A Natural Philosophy of Sex. Helix Books. Reading, MA: Addison-Wesley. ISBN 978-0-201-40754-9. LCCN 94013158. OCLC 30625193.
- Michod, Richard E. (1999). Darwinian Dynamics: Evolutionary Transitions in Fitness and Individuality. Princeton, NJ: Princeton University Press. ISBN 978-0-691-02699-2. LCCN 98004166. OCLC 38948118.
- Miller, William B. Jr. (2013). The Microcosm Within: Evolution and Extinction in the Hologenome. Boca Raton, FL: Universal-Publishers. ISBN 978-1-61233-277-2. LCCN 2013033832. OCLC 859168474.
- Nowak, Ronald M. (1999). Walker's Mammals of the World (6th ed.). Baltimore, MD: Johns Hopkins University Press. ISBN 978-0-8018-5789-8. LCCN 98023686. OCLC 39045218.
- Symons, Donald (1979). The Evolution of Human Sexuality. New York: Oxford University Press. ISBN 978-0-19-502535-4. LCCN 78023361. OCLC 4494283.
- Williams, George C. (1974) [Originally published 1966]. Adaptation and Natural Selection: A Critique of Some Current Evolutionary Thought. Princeton Science Library. Princeton, NJ: Princeton University Press. ISBN 978-0-691-02357-1. LCCN 65017164. OCLC 8500898.
- Williams, George C. (1992). Natural Selection: Domains, Levels, and Challenges. Oxford Series in Ecology and Evolution. New York: Oxford University Press. ISBN 978-0-19-506933-4. LCCN 91038938. OCLC 228136567.
