= Fight-or-flight response =

Physiological reaction to a perceived threat or harmful event

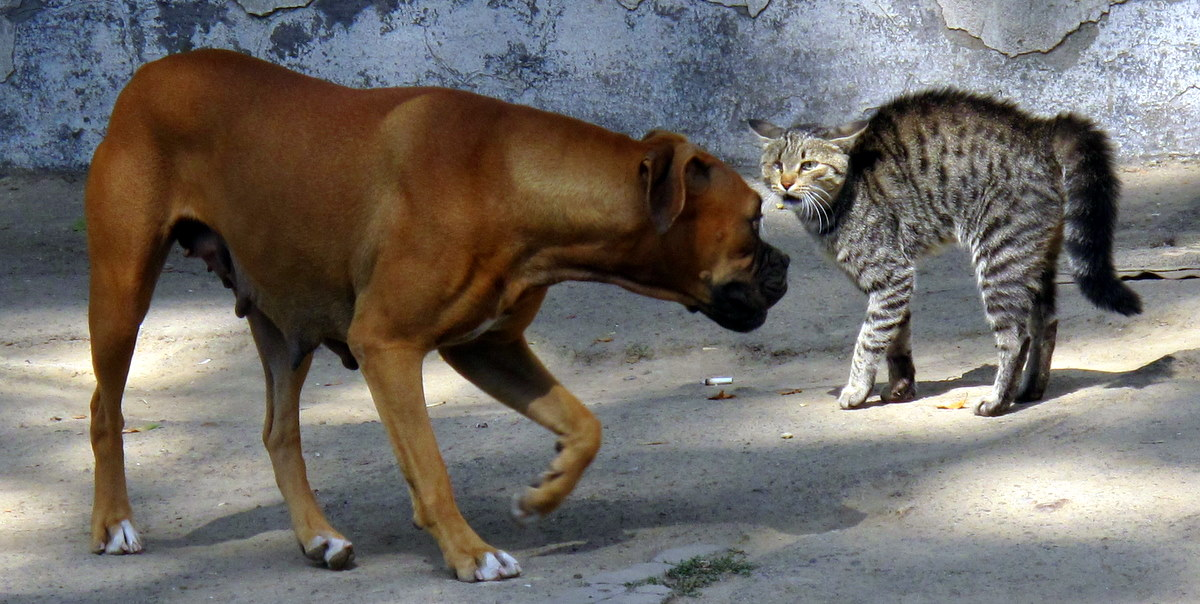
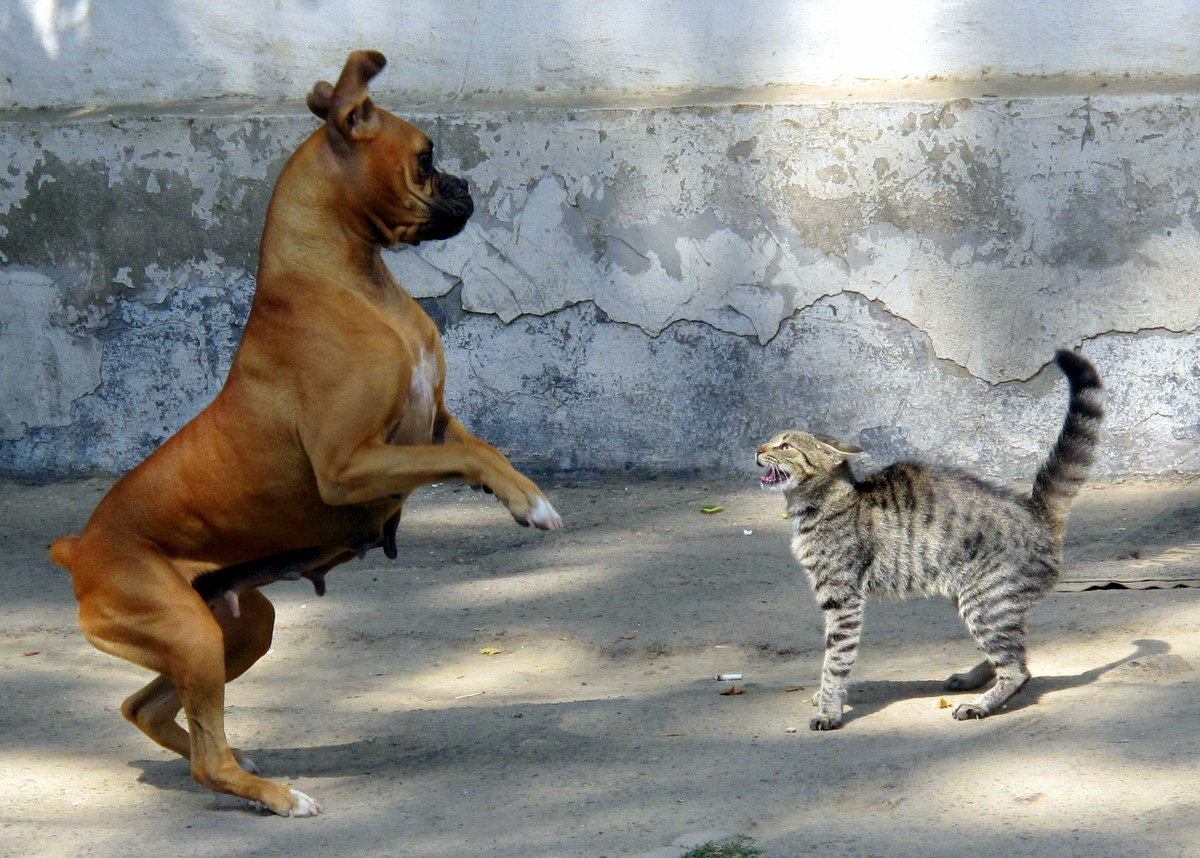
A dog and a cat encountering each other, expressing the fight (top) and flight (bottom) response simultaneously.

The fight-or-flight or the fight-flight-or-freeze response, also known as hyperarousal or acute stress response, is a physiological reaction that occurs in response to a perceived harmful event, attack, or threat to survival. It was first described by Walter Bradford Cannon in 1914 which he referred to as "the necessities of fighting or flight" in 1915. His theory states that animals react to threats with a general discharge of the sympathetic nervous system, preparing the animal for fighting or fleeing. More specifically, the adrenal medulla produces a hormonal cascade that results in the secretion of catecholamines, especially norepinephrine and epinephrine. The hormones estrogen, testosterone, and cortisol, as well as the neurotransmitters dopamine and serotonin, also affect how organisms react to stress. The hormone osteocalcin might also play a part.

This response is recognised as the first stage of the general adaptation syndrome that regulates stress responses among vertebrates and other organisms.

== Name ==
Originally understood as the "fight-or-flight" response in Cannon's research, the state of hyperarousal results in several responses beyond fighting or fleeing. The wider array of responses, such as freezing, flop, faint, flee and fright, has led researchers to use more neutral or accommodating terminology such as "hyperarousal" or the "acute stress response". This has led people to calling it the "fight, flight, freeze" response, "fight-flight-freeze-fawn" or "fight-flight-faint-or-freeze", among other variants.

== Physiology ==
=== Autonomic nervous system ===
The autonomic nervous system is a control system that acts largely subconsciously and regulates heart rate, digestion, respiratory rate, pupillary response, urination, and sexual arousal. This system is the primary mechanism in control of the fight-or-flight response and its role is mediated by two different components: the sympathetic nervous system and the parasympathetic nervous system.

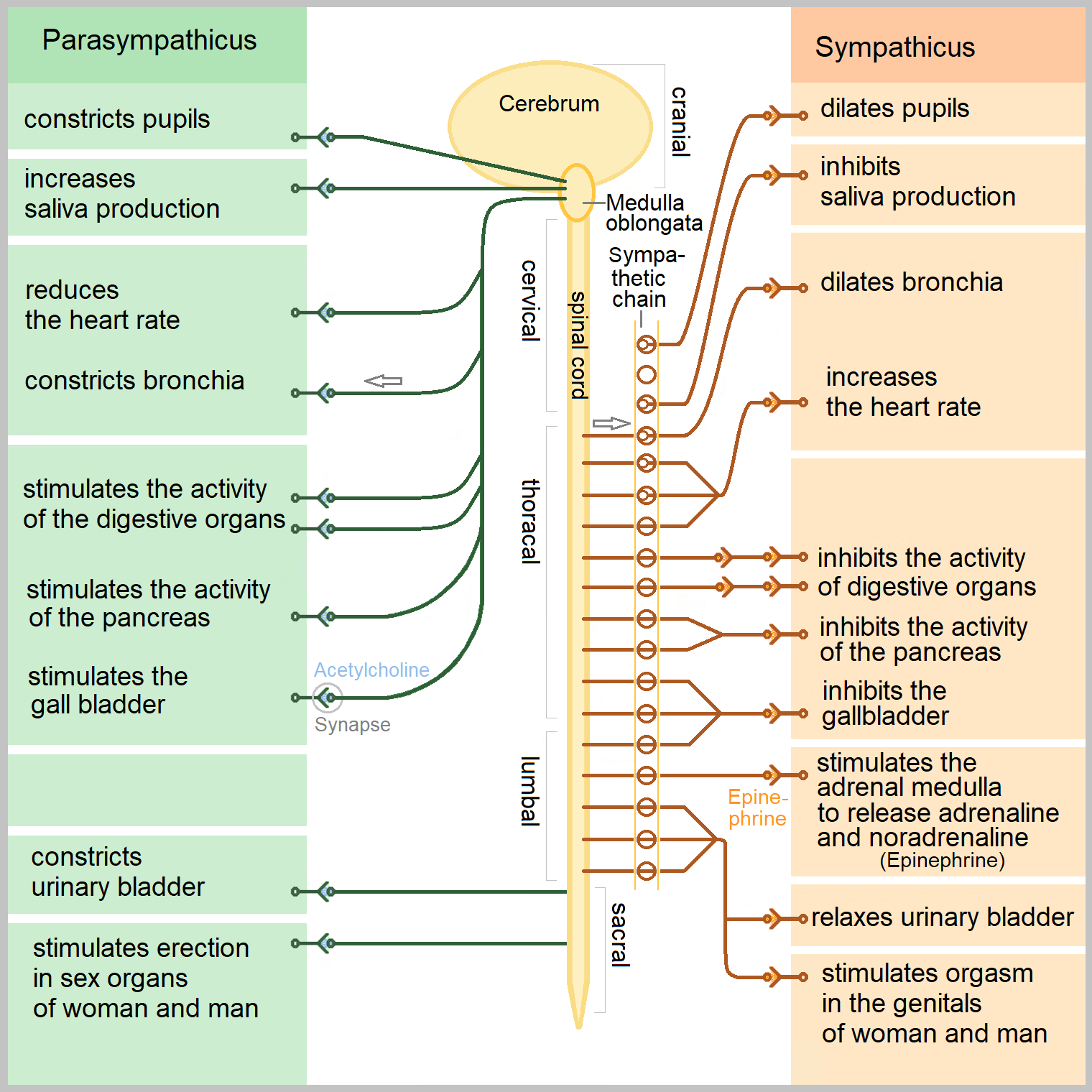
Comparison of Sympathetic and Parasympathetic nervous systems

==== Sympathetic nervous system ====
The sympathetic nervous system originates in the spinal cord and its main function is to activate the arousal responses that occur during the fight-or-flight response. The sympathetic nervous system transfers signals from the dorsal hypothalamus, which activates the heart, increases vascular resistance, and increases blood flow, especially to the muscle, heart, and brain tissues. It activates the adrenal medulla, releasing catecholamines that amplify the sympathetic response. Additionally, this component of the autonomic nervous system utilizes and activates the release of norepinephrine by the adrenal glands in the reaction.

==== Parasympathetic nervous system ====
The parasympathetic nervous system originates in the sacral spinal cord and medulla, physically surrounding the sympathetic origin, and works in concert with the sympathetic nervous system. It is known as the calming portion of the autonomic nervous system. While the sympathetic nervous system is activated, the parasympathetic nervous system decreases its response. Efferent vagal fibers originating from the nucleus ambiguous fire in parallel to the respiratory system, decreasing the vagal cardiac parasympathetic tone. After the fight or flight response, the parasympathetic system's main function is to activate the "rest and digest" response and return the body to homeostasis. This system utilizes and activates the release of the neurotransmitter acetylcholine.

=== Reaction ===
The reaction begins in the amygdala, which triggers a neural response in the hypothalamus. The initial reaction is followed by activation of the pituitary gland and secretion of the hormone ACTH. The adrenal gland is activated almost simultaneously, via the sympathetic nervous system, and releases the hormone epinephrine. The release of chemical messengers results in the production of the hormone cortisol, which increases blood pressure, blood sugar, and suppresses the immune system.

The initial response and subsequent reactions are triggered in an effort to create a boost of energy. This boost of energy is activated by epinephrine binding to liver cells and the subsequent production of glucose. Additionally, the circulation of cortisol functions to turn fatty acids into available energy, which prepares muscles throughout the body for response.

Catecholamine hormones, such as adrenaline (epinephrine) or noradrenaline (norepinephrine), facilitate immediate physical reactions associated with a preparation for violent muscular action.

=== Function of physiological changes ===
The physiological changes that occur during the fight or flight response are activated to give the body increased strength and speed in anticipation of fighting or running. Some of the specific physiological changes and their functions include:

- Increased blood flow to the muscles and brain activated by diverting blood flow from other parts of the body to make taking quick action easier, this decreases blood flow to the digestive system, which reduces appetite and the ability to digest food.
- Increased blood pressure and heart rate enhance cardiac output in order to supply the body with more energy.
- The liver secretes increased amounts of glucose (through adrenaline-induced glycogenolysis) and fats into the blood to provide the body with a fuel source to meet energy demands.
- The respiratory rate increases to supply the oxygen necessary to help burn the extra glucose.
- The blood clotting function of the body speeds up in order to reduce bleeding and prevent excessive blood loss in the event of an injury sustained during the response.
- Increased muscle tension in order to provide the body with extra speed and strength, which can result in trembling or shaking until the tension is released.
- The pupils dilate to let in more light, allowing for better vision of the body's surroundings.

== Emotional components ==
=== Emotion regulation ===
In the context of the fight or flight response, emotional regulation is used proactively to avoid threats of stress or to control the level of emotional arousal. Emotional socialization can develop someone's ability to successfully regulate their emotions. Faced with a perceived threat (in the context of a fight or flight situation) those raised with supportive parental behaviors are far more likely to easily self-regulate their emotions.

=== Emotional reactivity ===
During the reaction, the intensity of emotion that is brought on by the stimulus will also determine the nature and intensity of the behavioral response. In an experiment conducted by Clayton, Lang, Leshner and Quick (2019), they viewed the responses of 49 participants to antitobacco messages. Participants reacted in two orders of fashion after seeing the message with the individual smoker and their effects on those surrounding them. The first reaction was participants who had higher defense mechanisms, who decided to ignore the messages, while the other participants who had lower defense mechanisms, ended up arguing and becoming frustrated after viewing the antitobacco messages. Individuals with higher levels of emotional reactivity (Such as an anxiety disorder) may be prone to anxiety and aggression, which illustrates the implications of appropriate emotional reaction in the fight or flight response.

== Cognitive components ==
=== Content specificity ===
The specific components of cognitions in the fight or flight response seem to be largely negative. These negative cognitions may be characterised by: attention to negative stimuli, the perception of ambiguous situations as negative, and the recurrence of recalling negative words. There also may be specific negative thoughts associated with emotions commonly seen in the reaction.

=== Perception of control ===
Perceived control relates to an individual's thoughts about control over situations and events. Perceived control should be differentiated from actual control because an individual's beliefs about their abilities may not reflect their actual abilities. Therefore, overestimation or underestimation of perceived control can lead to anxiety and aggression.

=== Social information processing ===
The social information processing model proposes a variety of factors that determine behavior in the context of social situations and preexisting thoughts. The attribution of hostility, especially in ambiguous situations, seems to be one of the most important cognitive factors associated with the fight or flight response because of its implications towards aggression.

== Other animals ==
=== Evolutionary perspective ===
An evolutionary psychology explanation is that early animals had to react to threatening stimuli quickly and did not have time to psychologically and physically prepare themselves. The fight or flight response provided them with the mechanisms to rapidly respond to threats against survival.

=== Examples ===
A typical example of the stress response is a grazing zebra. If the zebra sees a lion closing in for the kill, the stress response is activated as a means to escape its predator. The escape requires intense muscular effort, supported by all of the body's systems. The sympathetic nervous system's activation provides for these needs. A similar example involving fight is of a cat about to be attacked by a dog. The cat shows accelerated heartbeat, piloerection (hair standing on end), and pupil dilation, all signs of sympathetic arousal. Note that the zebra and cat still maintain homeostasis in all states.

In July 1992, Behavioral Ecology published experimental research conducted by biologist Lee A. Dugatkin where guppies were sorted into "bold", "ordinary", and "timid" groups based upon their reactions when confronted by a smallmouth bass (i.e. inspecting the predator, hiding, or swimming away) after which the guppies were left in a tank with the bass. After 60 hours, 40 percent of the timid guppies and 15 percent of the ordinary guppies survived while none of the bold guppies did.

=== Varieties of responses ===
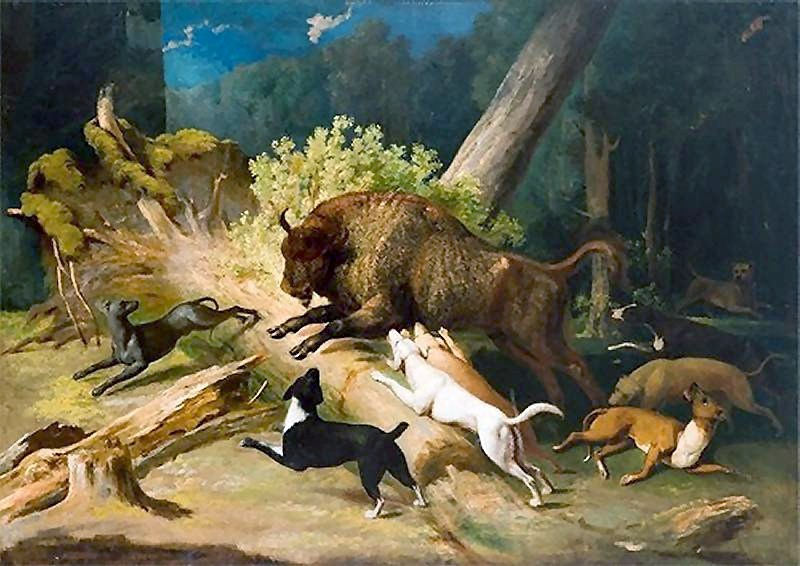
Bison hunted by dogs

Animals respond to threats in many complex ways. Rats, for instance, try to escape when threatened but will fight when cornered. Some animals stand perfectly still so that predators will not see them. Many animals freeze or play dead when touched in the hope that the predator will lose interest.

Other animals have alternative self-protection methods. Some species of cold-blooded animals change color swiftly to camouflage themselves. These responses are triggered by the sympathetic nervous system, but, in order to fit the model of fight or flight, the idea of flight must be broadened to include escaping capture either in a physical or sensory way. Thus, flight can be disappearing to another location or just disappearing in place, and fight and flight are often combined in a given situation.

The fight or flight actions also have polarity – the individual can either fight against or flee from something that is threatening, such as a hungry lion, or fight for or fly towards something that is needed, such as the safety of the shore from a raging river.

A threat from another animal does not always result in immediate fight or flight. There may be a period of heightened awareness, during which each animal interprets behavioral signals from the other. Signs such as paling, piloerection, immobility, sounds, and body language communicate the status and intentions of each animal. There may be a sort of negotiation, after which fight or flight may ensue, but which might also result in playing, mating, or nothing at all. An example of this is kittens playing: each kitten shows the signs of sympathetic arousal, but they never inflict real damage.

== In criminal law ==
Acute stress response is a common issue in self-defense criminal cases. Expert opinions are usually required if the defender's fault becomes the focus of the case.

== See also ==
- Acute stress reaction
- Anxiety
- Anxiety disorder
- Apparent death
- Body reactivity
- Coping (psychology)
- Defense physiology
- Emotional dysregulation
- Fear
- Four Fs (evolution)
- Freezing behavior
- Generalized anxiety disorder
- Escape distance
- Hypothalamic–pituitary–adrenal axis
- Panic attack
- Phobia
- Rest and digest
- Social anxiety
- Social anxiety disorder
- Tend and befriend
- The Relaxation Response
- Vasoconstriction
- Yerkes–Dodson law
- Reflex syncope
- Hypervigilance
