= Predatory imminence continuum =

Animals have many different tactics for defending themselves, depending on the severity of the threat they are encountering. Stages of threat vary along a spectrum referred to as the "predatory imminence continuum", spanning from low-risk (pre-encounter) to high-risk (interaction) threats. The main assumption of the predatory imminence continuum is that as threat levels increase, defensive response strategies change. During the pre-encounter period, an animal may engage in activities like exploration or foraging. But if the animal senses that a predator is nearby, the animal may begin to express species specific defense reactions such as freezing in an attempt to avoid detection by the predator. However, in situations where a threat is imminent, once the animal is detected by its predator, freezing may no longer be the optimal behaviour for survival. At this point, the animal enters the circa-strike phase, where its behaviour will transition from passive freezing to active flight, or even attack if escape is not possible.

== Development ==
The development of the predatory imminence continuum began with the description of species-specific defence reactions. Species-specific defence reactions are innate responses demonstrated by an animal when they experience a threat. Since survival behaviours are so vital for an animal to acquire and demonstrate rapidly, it has been theorized that these defence reactions would not have time to be learned and therefore, must be innate. While these behaviours are species-specific, there are three general categories of defence reactions - fleeing, freezing, and threatening. Species-specific defence reactions are now recognized as being organized in a hierarchical system where different behaviours are exhibited, depending on the level of threat experienced. However, when this concept was first proposed, the dominant species-specific defence reaction in a certain context was thought to be controlled by operant conditioning. That is, if a species-specific defence reaction was unsuccessful in evading or controlling conflict, the hierarchical system would be rearranged because of the punishment, in the form of failure, experienced by an animal. It would then be unlikely for that species-specific defence reaction to be used in a similar situation again; instead, an alternative behaviour would be dominant. However, if the dominant behaviour was successful it would remain the recurring behaviour for that situation. After experimentation, this theory was met with much opposition, even by the person who proposed it. One point of opposition was found through the use of shock on rats and the species-specific defence reaction of freezing. This experiment found that while punishment did seem to affect freezing, it was not through response weakening but through the evoking of different levels of the behaviour. Other criticisms for this theory focused on the inability for species-specific defence reactions to effectively rearrange in this manner in natural situations. It has been argued that there would not be enough time for punishment, in the form of an animal being unsuccessful in its defence, to reorder the hierarchy of species-specific defence reactions. The rejection of the operant conditioning mechanism for the reorganization of species-specific defence reactions, led to the development of the predatory imminence continuum. The organization of defensive behaviours can be attributed to the level of threat an animal perceives itself to be in. This theory is one of adaptiveness, as the dominant defence reaction is the behaviour which is most effective in allowing the survival of the animal and the one which is most effective in preventing an increasing level of threat, also known as increasing imminence. The probability of being killed by a predator, known as predatory imminence, is what is responsible for the expressed defensive behaviour. The predatory imminence is dependent on many factors such as the distance from a predator, the potential for escape, and the likelihood of meeting a predator. Three general categories of defensive behaviours, based on increasing predatory imminence, have been identified. These are labelled as pre-encounter, post-encounter, and circa-strike defensive behaviours.

== Stages of threat ==
=== Pre-encounter ===
Behaviours exhibited by animals when the threat of a predator is extremely low are known as preferred activity patterns. When the likelihood of predation increases above this point an animal enters into pre-encounter defensive behaviours. These behaviours are used to reduce the probability of having to exhibit avoidance behaviours, which are evoked when a predator is detected. Pre-encounter behaviours can be observed when an animal has left the safety of its residence to perform tasks such as mating or foraging, and occur before a predator has been identified. The animal does not perform these behaviours because of a predator, instead these behaviours are performed or altered depending on the probability of being detected by a predator when executing a task. One well studied example of a pre-encounter behaviour is that of varying meal frequency and size seen in foraging rats. When rats forage they do not typically hoard food, instead they either ingest the food where it was found or retreat to a nearby safe space to consume their meal. Depending on the level of perceived threat, a rat will vary the frequency of foraging and the size of its meal. In laboratory studies investigating this pre-encounter behaviour, density of shocks are often used to represent the risk of predation. A number of shocks are administered daily on a random schedule, the more shocks administered per day the higher the perceived predatory imminence. The shocks only affect the rats when they are outside of their safe nest area, but to get food they have to leave this area and press a lever to dispense their meal. This models the real-life situation of a rat needing to leave the relative safety of its nest to go foraging for food. The common finding is that, as the perceived threat of predation increases, the frequency of foraging decreases but the size of the consumed meal increases. The increased meal size ensures that even though the rat leaves the safe area in search of food less often, it still consumes a relatively constant amount of food each day, regardless of shock density. This organized modulation of foraging behaviour is consistent with a pre-encounter defensive behaviour. The frequency and meal size associated with foraging are reorganized depending on the perceived level of threat but they are not directly influenced by the interaction with a predator.

=== Post-encounter ===
Post-encounter defensive behaviours are avoidance behaviours performed when a predator is present and has been detected. When this stage of threat has been reached, behaviours are limited to species-specific defence reactions. These behaviours are commonly freezing, fleeing or threatening. The goal of a post-encounter defensive behaviour is to prevent the predatory imminence from further increasing. The dominant post-encounter defensive behaviour can depend on whether the predator has also detected the prey and how far away the two animals are from one another. Varying levels of predatory imminence, even in post-encounter situations, can affect the expressed defensive behaviour. If the prey has yet to be detected, the goal of the post-encounter behaviour will be to prevent the predator from detecting the prey. If both the predator and prey have detected each other, the goal will be to avoid making contact with the predator. Freezing behaviour in rats is an example of a post-encounter defensive behaviour which has been well studied. Freezing in rats is characterized by sudden, extended immobility, followed by a decreased heart rate and an increased respiration rate. This behaviour is often the dominant post-encounter defence behaviour in rats. In the laboratory setting, post-encounter defensive behaviours can be elicited by pairing a neutral stimulus, such as a light, with an aversive stimulus, such as a shock. The rat will engage in its post-encounter defensive behaviour when it becomes aware of the neutral stimulus, as the stimulus is acting as a predictor for the shock. Since the freezing behaviour is dominant in these situations, it can be assumed that it serves an adaptive function by preventing an additional increase in predatory imminence. Freezing is the dominant post-encounter behaviour because even when there are alternative defensive reactions available, freezing has been observed to be the rat's response the majority of the time. Even when a clear method of escape was made available, rats would freeze instead of fleeing. Freezing can prevent the perceived level of threat from increasing in several ways. If a rat becomes aware of a predator before the predator is aware of the prey, freezing can reduce the likelihood that the prey will be detected. As well, since many predators rely on motion to keep track of their prey, freezing may cause the predator to either lose site of their prey or shift their attention to a more active object.

=== Circa-strike ===
When a predator is prepared to strike or has stricken, the prey's behaviours change from post-encounter to circa-strike defensive behaviours. These reactions are employed if the post-encounter behaviours are unsuccessful. A predator making contact with its prey is the highest level of predatory imminence experienced before being killed by a predator. Therefore, the goal of circa-strike behaviours are to survive and escape from the predator during or after contact. These defence behaviours are often more reactive than post-encounter behaviours and are commonly in the form of jumping, vocalizing, striking or biting. If the animal is successful in evading its predator then, when it has found a safe location, it will eventually return to its preferred activity patterns. One example of an extremely successful circa-strike defensive behaviour is the evasive leaping of the kangaroo rat. Kangaroo rats are desert dwelling mammals preyed upon by venomous sidewinder rattlesnakes. When rattlesnakes strike, kangaroo rats exhibit a quick and forceful circa-strike behaviour in the form of a leap using their hind legs. This leaping reaction serves several functions both to help escape and prevent envenomation. First, the kangaroo rat is able to jump within around 50ms after perceiving an incoming snake strike. This gives the rat the ability to avoid contact with the predator all together, thus allowing it to escape unharmed. If the leap is unsuccessful in completely avoiding the snake's strike, it still serves the purpose of preventing the fangs from embedding. The jumping action is so forceful that the rat may be able to disrupt the snake's striking movement. Finally, if all else fails and the fangs have made contact with the kangaroo rat, it is still able to employ its evasive leaping behaviour, and with the use of its hind legs, forcefully dislodge the snake's fangs and prevent envenomation. This leaping behaviour serves the function of preventing or escaping contact with a predator immediately before, during, or after an attack, therefore, it is consistent with a circa-strike defensive behaviour.
