= Body reactivity =

Body reactivity is usually understood as an organism's functional ability of its body to react adequately in response to influence the environment. It is not to be confused with resistance, which is its physiological stability against the influence of pathogenic factors. The body reactivity can range from homeostasis to a fight or flight response. Ultimately, they are all governed by the nervous system.

== Nervous system divisions ==
The central nervous system (CNS) consists of parts that are encased by the bones of the skull and spinal column: the brain and spinal cord. The peripheral nervous system (PNS) is found outside those bones and consists of the nerves and most of the sensory organs.

=== Central nervous system ===
The CNS can be divided into the brain and spinal cord. The CNS processes many different kinds of incoming sensory information. It is also the source of thoughts, emotions, and memories. Most signals that stimulate muscles to contract and glands to secrete originate in the CNS. The spinal cord and spinal nerves contribute to homeostasis by providing quick reflexive responses to many stimuli. The spinal cord is the pathway for sensory input to the brain and motor output from the brain. The brain is responsible for integrating most sensory information and coordinating body function, both consciously and unconsciously.

=== Peripheral nervous system ===
The PNS can be divided into the autonomic and somatic nervous system. The autonomic nervous system can be divided into the parasympathetic, sympathetic, and enteric nervous system. The sympathetic nervous system regulates the "fight or flight" responses. The parasympathetic nervous system regulates the "rest and digest" responses. The enteric nervous system innervates the viscera (gastrointestinal tract, pancreas, and gall bladder). The somatic nervous system consists of peripheral nerve fibers that send sensory information to the central nervous system and motor nerve fibers that project to skeletal muscle. The somatic nervous system engages in voluntary reactions, and the autonomic nervous system engages in involuntary reactions.

Structure	Sympathetic Stimulation	Parasympathetic Stimulation
Iris (Eye Muscle)	Pupil Dilation	Pupil Constriction
Salivary Glands	Saliva Production Reduces	Saliva Production Increases
Oral/ Nasal Mucosa	Mucus Production Reduced	Mucus Production Increases
Heart	Heart Rate and Force Increased	Heart Rate and Force Decreased
Lung	Bronchial Muscle Relaxed	Bronchial Muscle Contracted
Stomach	Peristalsis Reduced	Gastric Juice Secreted, Motility Increased
Small Intestine	Motility Reduced	Digestion Increased
Large Intestine	Motility Reduced	Secretion and Motility Increased
Liver	Increased Conversion of Glycogen to Glucose	
Kidney	Decreased Urine Secretion	Increased Urine Secretion
Adrenal Medulla	Norepinephrine and Epinephrine Secreted	
Bladder	Wall Relaxed, Sphincter Closed	Wall Contracted, Sphincter Relaxed

== Reactions ==
=== Fight or flight ===
Fight or flight is governed by the sympathetic nervous system. The sympathetic division increases automaticity and excitability of the SA node, which increases heart rate. It also increases conductivity of electrical impulses through the atrioventricular conduction system and increases the force of atrioventricular contraction. Sympathetic influence increases during inhalation.

=== Rest and digest ===
This governed by the parasympathetic nervous system. The parasympathetic division decreases automaticity and excitability, which increases heart rate. It also decreases conductivity of electrical impulses through the atrioventricular conduction system and decreases the force of atrioventricular contraction. Parasympathetic influence increases during exhalation.

=== Startle and orienting response ===
Startle response interrupts and disengages the organism from ongoing activity, directs attention to stimuli, and protects the organism from potential harmful stimuli. Orienting response is an organism's innate reaction to a novel stimulus, and it is a defensive response. Heart rate increases after the onset of startle stimuli. The heart rate decreases during the orienting response.

== Measurement techniques for body reactivity ==
=== Electroencephalography ===
The electroencephalogram records the electrical activity on the surface of the cerebral cortex. Four simple periodic rhythms recorded in the EEG are alpha, beta, delta, and theta, which are distinguished by frequency and amplitude.

Rhythm	Typical Frequencies (Hz)	Typical Amplitude (μV)
Alpha	8-13	20-200
Beta	13-30	5-10
Delta	20-200	20-200
Theta	10	10

=== Electrocardiography ===
By placing electrodes on other parts of the body, the echoes of the heart's electrical activity can be detected. The record of the electrical signal is called an electrocardiogram. The heart's mechanical activity can be inferred from the ECG. A p wave which signifies atrial depolarization (contraction), a QRS complex which indicates ventricular depolarization, and a T wave which indicates ventricular repolarization (recovery.) Atrial repolarization would take place roughly around the QRS complex, but is hidden due to its small signal, as well as the ventricular contraction's amplitude.

=== Electromyography ===
The detection, amplification, and recording of changes in skin voltage produced by underlying skeletal muscle contraction is called electromyography. Motor recruitment and skeletal muscle fatigue can be examined by combining EMG and dynamometry, which measures power. Facial EMG can measure startle response in humans.

=== Electrodermal activity ===
Electrodermal activity describes changes in the skins ability to conduct electricity. EDA used to be known as the galvanic skin response, which is the combination of the changes in the galvanic skin resistance and galvanic skin potential. The polygraph measures the EDA, respiration and heart rate.
