= The Growth of Biological Thought =

1982 book by Ernst Mayr

- Title page for The Growth of Biological Thought (1982)
- Author: Ernst Mayr
- Language: English
- Genre: Non-fiction
- Publisher: Belknap Press
- Publication date: 1982
- Pages: 992
- ISBN: 0674364465

The Growth of Biological Thought: Diversity, Evolution, and Inheritance is a book written by Ernst Mayr, first published in 1982 by Belknap Press and is as much a book of philosophy and history as it is of biology.

It is a sweeping, academic study of the first 2,400 years of the science of biology. It focuses largely on how the philosophical assumptions of biologists influenced and limited their understanding. It includes many important general observations about the role of philosophy in scientific inquiry and the place of biology amongst the sciences.

== Reception ==
Horace Freeland Judson praised the book for its extremely extensive coverage which he likened to an encyclopaedia. He commended the book for examining through the lens of evolution the discipline whose central theory is the theory of evolution, writing that it "turns the scholarly component of Darwinian method reflexively onto the evolution of the very disciplines that make up evolutionary theory".
