= Toward a New Philosophy of Biology =

Book by Ernst Mayr

- Author: Ernst Mayr
- Language: English
- Genre: Non-fiction
- Publisher: Harvard University Press
- Publication date: 1988
- Publication place: United States

Toward a New Philosophy of Biology: Observations of an Evolutionist (published by Harvard University Press, Cambridge, Massachusetts, in 1988) is a book by Harvard evolutionary biologist Ernst Mayr.

It is a collection of 28 essays, five previously unpublished, grouped into ten categories—Philosophy, Natural Selection, Adaptation, Darwin, Diversity, Species, Speciation, Macroevolution, and Historical Perspective. The book, Mayr notes in the Forward, is an attempt "to strengthen the bridge between biology and philosophy, and point to the new direction in which a new philosophy of biology will move."

== Reviews ==
- Ayala, Francisco J. Science, New Series, Vol. 240, No. 4860 (June, 1988).
- Griesemer, James R. The Quarterly Review of Biology, Vol. 64, No. 1 (March, 1989).
- Maienschein, Jane. Isis, Vol. 80, No. 3 (September, 1989).
- Smith, John Maynard. New York Review of Books, Volume 39, Number 9, May 14, 1992.
