= Søren Løvtrup =

Soren Løvtrup (1922–2002) was a Danish embryologist and historian of science in the Department of Animal Physiology at the Umeå University, Sweden. Løvtrup was known for his macromutation theory of evolution, which was in opposition to traditional neo-Darwinism. In 1987, Løvtrup published his controversial book Darwinism: The Refutation of a Myth which challenged Charles Darwin's role as the intellectual founder of evolutionary theory and accused Darwin of plagiarism.

== Career ==
Løvtrup was born in Copenhagen. In 1945, he enrolled at University of Copenhagen, where he obtained a master's degree in biochemistry. He worked at Carlsberg Laboratory, until 1953 when he received a PhD in embryology. He also worked at University of Gothenburg. From 1965, he worked at Umeå University in Sweden as a professor of animal physiology.

== Research ==
=== Darwinism: The Refutation of a Myth ===
Løvtrup is best known for his book Darwinism: The Refutation of a Myth (1987). In this controversial work, he claimed that Jean-Baptiste Lamarck was the real founder of evolution and that natural selection was discovered by Erasmus Darwin, Patrick Matthew and other naturalists before Charles Darwin. The book supports the ideas of early evolutionary thinkers such as Karl Ernst von Baer, Étienne Geoffroy Saint-Hilaire and St. George Jackson Mivart. He was a critic of gradualism and the punctuated equilibrium theory of evolution.

Løvtrup argued against the micromutation theory of the modern evolutionary synthesis and promoted his own theory of macromutation (saltational evolution). Biologist Bruce Wallace gave the book a mixed review, stating that Løvtrup was advocating a minority position in evolutionary biology and he "underestimates existing genetic variation, consequently, he favors evolutionary events that occur rarely even on a geologic time scale."

Herpetologist Hobart Muir Smith wrote that the book with its sensationalist title would be highjacked by creationists but it is not against the fact of evolution, only against the Darwinian interpretation. Smith concluded "Certainly the book will strike many as controversial, but Løvtrup has given the world a truly epochal, introspective analysis of inestimable potential value."

Science historian Keith Stewart Thomson gave the book a negative review commenting "Many of the sacred cows that Løvtrup wants to slaughter are either long since dead or merely made of straw. It is tedious to constantly to see Darwin and his followers taken to task for failing to be as smart as we are now."

The book was criticized for providing no solid evidence for macromutations, Løvtrup only cited two alleged cases in his book.

=== Other works ===
Løvtrup's book Epigenetics (1974) was a work on theoretical biology which attempted to present a unifying theory of epigenesis. Biologist Clifford Grobstein wrote that the book was a mixture of ideas, "sometimes illuminating, sometimes naïve, sometimes superficial, sometimes sophisticated, sometimes enormously detailed."

He contributed a paper on his alternative evolutionary views to the book Alternative Life-History Styles of Animals (1990).

== Publications ==
- Studies on Amphibian Embryogenesis (1953)
- Epigenetics: A Treatise on Theoretical Biology (1974)
- The Phylogeny of Vertebrates (1977)
- Darwinism: The Refutation of a Myth (1987)

== Personal life ==
He married Ebba Lund, (a Danish Resistance fighter and later a microbiologist and chemical engineer) in 1944 and they had three children Vita (1945), Susanne (1948) and Anders (1951) before divorcing in 1959.

== See also ==
- Mutationism
- Richard Goldschmidt
