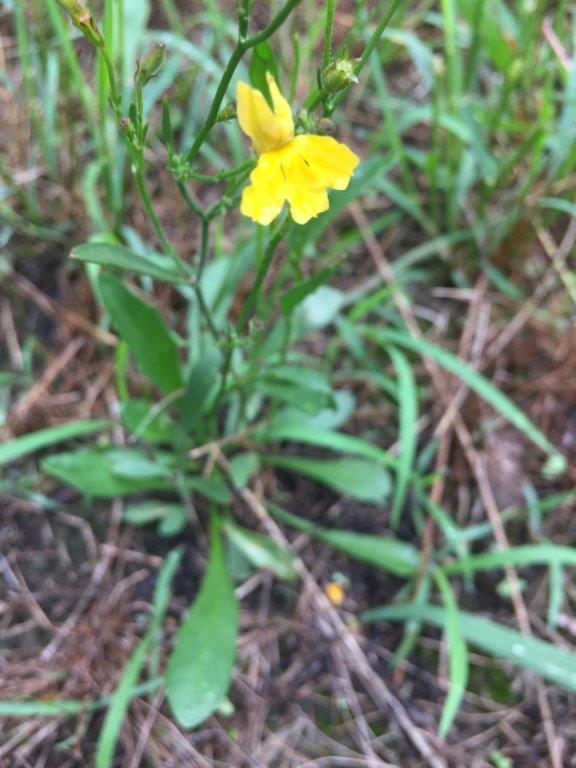

Scientific classification
- Kingdom: Plantae
- Clade: Tracheophytes
- Clade: Angiosperms
- Clade: Eudicots
- Clade: Asterids
- Order: Asterales
- Family: Goodeniaceae
- Genus: Goodenia
- Species: G. stelligera

Binomial name
- Goodenia stelligera R.Br.

Synonyms
- List: Goodenia armeriaefolia DC. orth. var.; Goodenia armerifolia Spreng. orth. var.; Goodenia armeriifolia Sieber ex Spreng. nom. illeg.; Goodenia armeriifolia Sieber ex DC. nom. illeg.; Goodenia longifolia de Vriese; Goodenia stelligera var. longifolia (de Vriese) Domin; Goodenia stelligera R.Br. var. stelligera; Goodenia stelligera var. typica Domin nom. inval.

= Goodenia stelligera =

Species of flowering plant

Goodenia stelligera, commonly referred to as spiked goodenia, is a species of flowering plant in the family Goodeniaceae and is endemic to near-coastal areas of eastern Australia. It is an erect herb with linear to lance-shaped leaves, sometimes with toothed edges, and racemes or thyrses of hairy yellow flowers.

== Description ==
Goodenia stelligera is an erect, glabrous herb that typically grows to a height of 60 cm (24 in) and forms adventitious roots. The leaves form a rosette at the base of the plant and are linear to lance-shaped with the narrower end towards the base, sometimes with small teeth on the edges, 50–250 mm (2.0–9.8 in) long, 1–12 mm (0.039–0.472 in) wide and sessile. The flowers are arranged in racemes or thyrses up to 600 mm (24 in) long with linear to lance-shaped bracts 10–25 mm (0.39–0.98 in) long, each flower sessile or on a pedicel up to 4 mm (0.16 in) long. The sepals are linear, 4–5 mm (0.16–0.20 in) long and the corolla is yellow, 13–15 mm (0.51–0.59 in) long with whitish, star-shaped hairs. The lower lobes of the corolla are 7–8 mm (0.28–0.31 in) long with wings 1.5–2.5 mm (0.059–0.098 in) wide. Flowering mainly occurs from August to February and the fruit is an oval capsule, 5–9 mm (0.20–0.35 in) long that opens to release elliptic brown seeds about 1.5 mm (0.059 in) long.

== Taxonomy ==
Goodenia stelligera was first formally described in 1810 by botanist Robert Brown in Prodromus Florae Novae Hollandiae. The specific epithet (stelligera) means "star-bearing".

== Distribution and habitat ==
Spiked goodenia grows in swamps on sandstone in near-coastal areas from south-eastern Queensland to near Braidwood in New South Wales.
