= Otto Schindewolf =

German paleontologist

- Born: 7 June 1896; Hanover
- Died: 10 June 1971 (aged 75); Tübingen
- Known for: evolution of corals and cephalopods
- Scientific career
- Fields: paleontology
- Workplaces: University of Marburg; University of Tübingen

Otto Heinrich Schindewolf (7 June 1896 – 10 June 1971) was a German paleontologist who studied the evolution of corals and cephalopods.

== Biography ==
Schindewolf was on the faculty at the University of Marburg from 1919 until 1927. Then he became director of the Geological Survey of Berlin. In 1948 he became a professor at the University of Tübingen, where he retired as professor emeritus in 1964.

He was a saltationist who opposed the theory of gradual evolution, and in the 1930s suggested that major evolutionary transformations must have occurred in large leaps between species. This idea became known as the Hopeful Monster theory and was further taken and developed up by the geneticist Richard Goldschmidt in the 1940s. Schindewolf was also the first to suggest, in 1950, that mass extinctions might have been caused by extraterrestrial impacts or nearby supernova. From 1948 until his retirement in 1964, Schindewolf was professor of Geology and Paleontology at the University of Tübingen.

== Evolution ==
As a saltationist Schindewolf had supported macromutations as part of his evolutionary theory. He was known for presenting an alternative interpretation of the fossil record, combining orthogenesis, mutationism and extraterrestrial impacts, as opposed to Darwin's gradualism. Schindewolf's theory claimed that variation tended to move in a predetermined direction. His theory became known as typostrophism and stated that evolution occurs due to a periodic cyclic model of evolutionary processes which are predestined to go through a life cycle dictated by factors internal to the organism.

Part of his "typostrophism" (German: Typostrophe) theory advocated sudden evolutionary change by macromutations but he later dropped this view. His theory of orthogenesis (guided, straight-line evolution) and eventual decay went through three stages (typogenesis [explosion of new types], typostasis [maintenance of types], and typolysis [splitting of types, degeneration]) claimed to be embedded within a cyclical view of the evolutionary process. His theory also proposed that mass extinctions, especially the ones at the end of the Permian period 252 million years ago, were the result of cosmic radiation caused by supernova explosions. Schindewolf speculated that a supernova star explosion could emit radiation lethal to organisms if close enough to earth. He proposed that the radiation from a supernova could have two effects, extinguishing many species of life and causing macromutations which in turn could cause new species to originate. Schindewolf was the only scientist to have speculated that the first bird may have hatched from a reptile's egg. It was only a speculation and he abandoned the view of macromutations in later publications.

His book Basic Questions in Paleontology was published in German in 1950 and was translated into English in 1993 with a foreword written by Stephen Jay Gould.

== Bibliography ==
(incomplete)

- (in German) Wenz W. (1938–1944) Teil 1: Allgemeiner Teil und Prosobranchia. In: Schindewolf O. H. (ed.) Handbuch der Paläozoologie, Band 6, Gastropoda, Verlag Gebrüder Bornträger, Berlin, xii + 1639 pp.

His Basic Questions in Paleontology was published in German in 1950, and was a landmark work in the field of paleontology and evolution.
