= Rapid modes of evolution =

Rapid modes of evolution have been proposed by several notable biologists after Charles Darwin proposed his theory of evolutionary descent by natural selection. In his book On the Origin of Species (1859), Darwin stressed the gradual nature of descent, writing:

It may be said that natural selection is daily and hourly scrutinizing, throughout the world, every variation, even the slightest; rejecting that which is bad, preserving and adding up all that is good; silently and insensibly working, whenever and wherever opportunity offers, at the improvement of each organic being in relation to its organic and inorganic conditions of life. We see nothing of these slow changes in progress, until the hand of time has marked the long lapses of ages, and then so imperfect is our view into long past geological ages, that we only see that the forms of life are now different from what they formerly were. (1859)

== Evolutionary developmental biology ==
Work in developmental biology has identified dynamical and physical mechanisms of tissue morphogenesis that may underlie such abrupt morphological transitions. Consequently, consideration of mechanisms of phylogenetic change that are actually (not just apparently) non-gradual is increasingly common in the field of evolutionary developmental biology, particularly in studies of the origin of morphological novelty. A description of such mechanisms can be found in the multi-authored volume Origination of Organismal Form.

== See also ==
- Evolution
- Evolutionary developmental biology
- Otto Schindewolf
- Punctuated equilibrium
- Quantum evolution
- Richard Goldschmidt
- Saltationism
- Industrial melanism
- Peppered moth evolution

== Bibliography ==
- Darwin, C. (1859) On the Origin of Species London: Murray.
- Goldschmidt, R. (1940) The Material Basis of Evolution. New Haven, Conn.: Yale University Press.
- Gould, S. J. (1977) "The Return of Hopeful Monsters" Natural History 86 (June/July): 22-30.
- Gould, S. J. (2002) The Structure of Evolutionary Theory. Cambridge MA: Harvard Univ. Press.
- Müller, G. B. and Newman, S. A., eds. (2003) Origination of Organismal Form: Beyond the Gene in Developmental and Evolutionary Biology. Cambridge: The MIT Press.
- Schindewolf, O. H. (1963) Neokatastrophismus? Zeits. Deutsch. Geol. Res. 114: 430-435.
- West-Eberhard, M. J. (2003). Developmental Plasticity and Evolution. Oxford University Press.
- Newman, S. A. and Bhat, R. (2009) Dynamical patterning modules: a "pattern language" for development and evolution of multicellular form. Int. J. Dev. Biol. 53: 693-705
