= Mutationism =

Alternative to evolution by natural selection

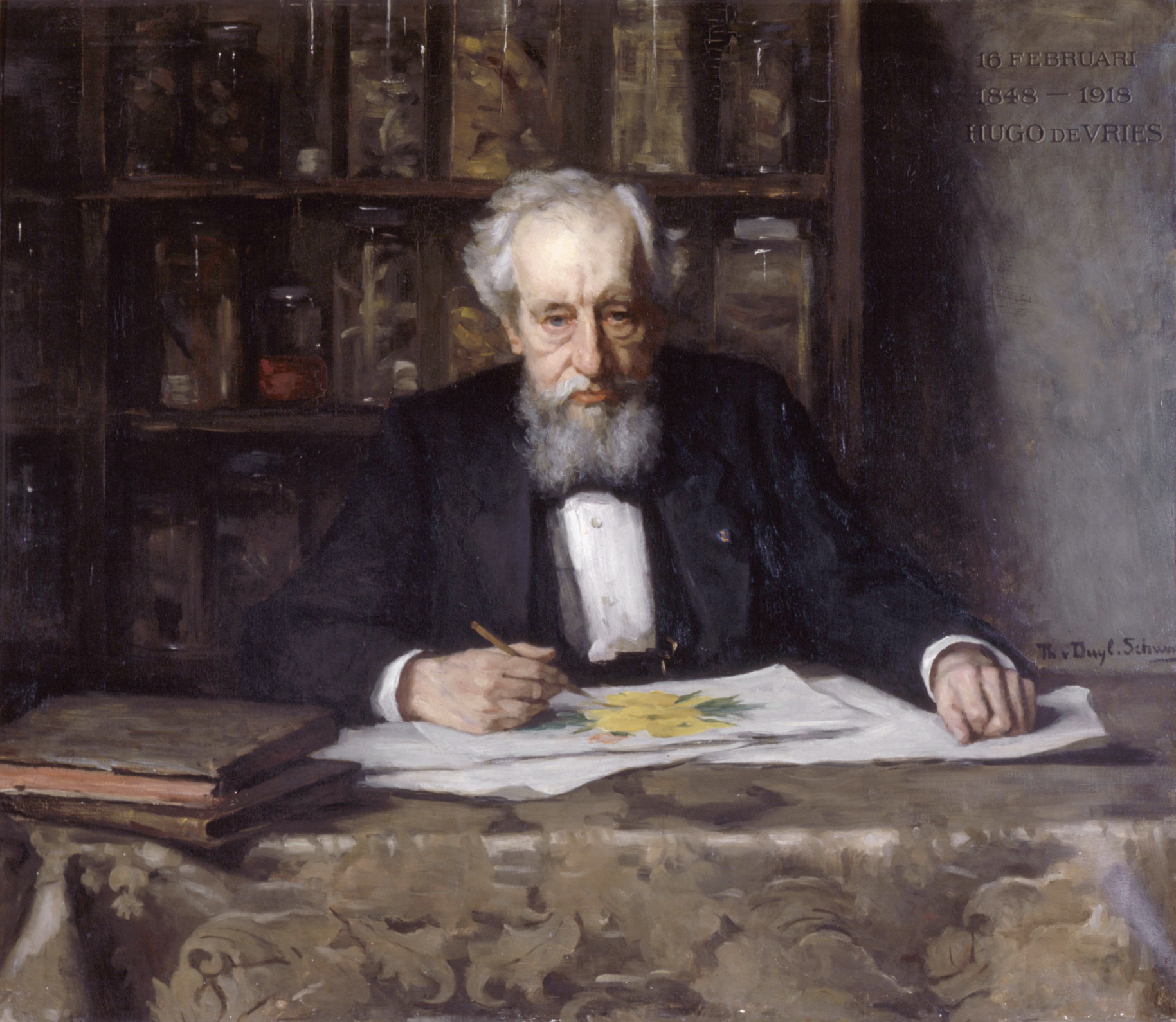
Painting of Hugo de Vries, making a painting of an evening primrose, the plant which had apparently produced new forms by large mutations in his experiments, by Thérèse Schwartze, 1918

Mutationism is one of several alternatives to evolution by natural selection that have existed both before and after the publication of Charles Darwin's 1859 book On the Origin of Species. In the theory, mutation was the source of novelty, creating new forms and new species, potentially instantaneously, in sudden jumps. This was envisaged as driving evolution, which was thought to be limited by the supply of mutations.

Before Darwin, biologists commonly believed in saltationism, the possibility of large evolutionary jumps, including immediate speciation. For example, in 1822 Étienne Geoffroy Saint-Hilaire argued that species could be formed by sudden transformations, or what would later be called macromutation. Darwin opposed saltation, insisting on gradualism in evolution as geology's uniformitarianism. In 1864, Albert von Kölliker revived Geoffroy's theory. In 1901 the geneticist Hugo de Vries gave the name "mutation" to seemingly new forms that suddenly arose in his experiments on the evening primrose Oenothera lamarckiana. In the first decade of the 20th century, mutationism, or as de Vries named it mutationstheorie, became a rival to Darwinism supported for a while by geneticists including William Bateson, Thomas Hunt Morgan, and Reginald Punnett.

Understanding of mutationism is clouded by the mid-20th century portrayal of the early mutationists by supporters of the modern synthesis as opponents of Darwinian evolution and rivals of the biometrics school who argued that selection operated on continuous variation. In this portrayal, mutationism was defeated by a synthesis of genetics and natural selection that supposedly started later, around 1918, with work by the mathematician Ronald Fisher. However, the alignment of Mendelian genetics and natural selection began as early as 1902 with a paper by Udny Yule, and built up with theoretical and experimental work in Europe and America. Despite the controversy, the early mutationists had by 1918 already accepted natural selection and explained continuous variation as the result of multiple genes acting on the same characteristic, such as height.

Mutationism, along with other alternatives to Darwinism like Lamarckism and orthogenesis, was discarded by most biologists as they came to see that Mendelian genetics and natural selection could readily work together; mutation took its place as a source of the genetic variation essential for natural selection to work on. However, mutationism did not entirely vanish. In 1940, Richard Goldschmidt again argued for single-step speciation by macromutation, describing the organisms thus produced as "hopeful monsters", earning widespread ridicule. In 1987, Masatoshi Nei argued controversially that evolution was often mutation-limited. Modern biologists such as Douglas J. Futuyma conclude that essentially all claims of evolution driven by large mutations can be explained by Darwinian evolution.

== Developments leading up to mutationism ==
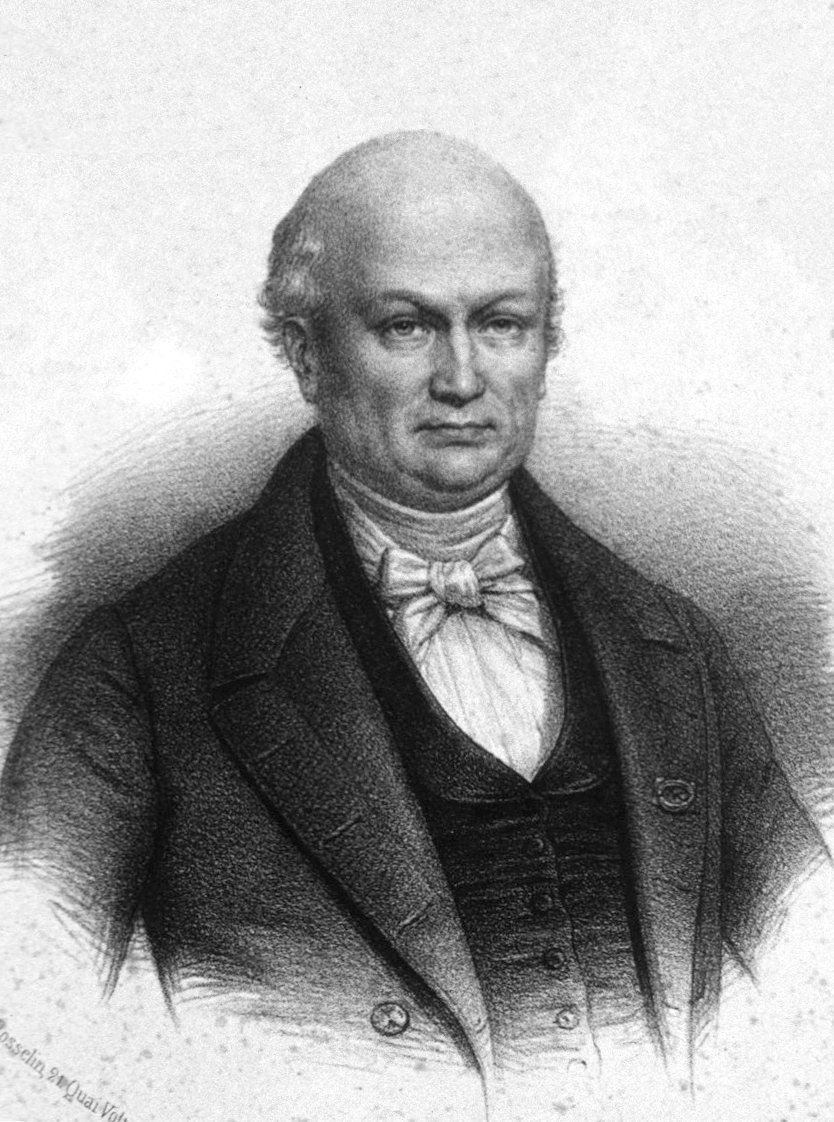
Étienne Geoffroy Saint-Hilaire believed that "monstrosities" could immediately found new species in a single large jump or saltation.

=== Geoffroy's monstrosities, 1822 ===
Prior to Charles Darwin, most naturalists were saltationists, (Note: The term mutation was not used in biology until the 20th century, but macromutation and saltation are essentially equivalent descriptions.) believing that species evolved and that speciation took place in sudden jumps. Jean-Baptiste Lamarck was a gradualist but similar to other scientists of the period had written that saltational evolution was possible.

In 1822, in the second volume of his Philosophie anatomique, Étienne Geoffroy Saint-Hilaire endorsed a theory of saltational evolution that "monstrosities could become the founding fathers (or mothers) of new species by instantaneous transition from one form to the next." Geoffroy wrote that environmental pressures could produce sudden transformations to establish new species instantaneously.

=== Darwin's anti-saltationist gradualism, 1859 ===
In his 1859 book On the Origin of Species, Charles Darwin denied saltational evolution. He argued that evolutionary transformation always proceeds gradually, never in jumps: "natural selection acts solely by accumulating slight successive favourable variations, it can produce no great or sudden modification; it can act only by very short steps". Darwin continued in this belief throughout his life.

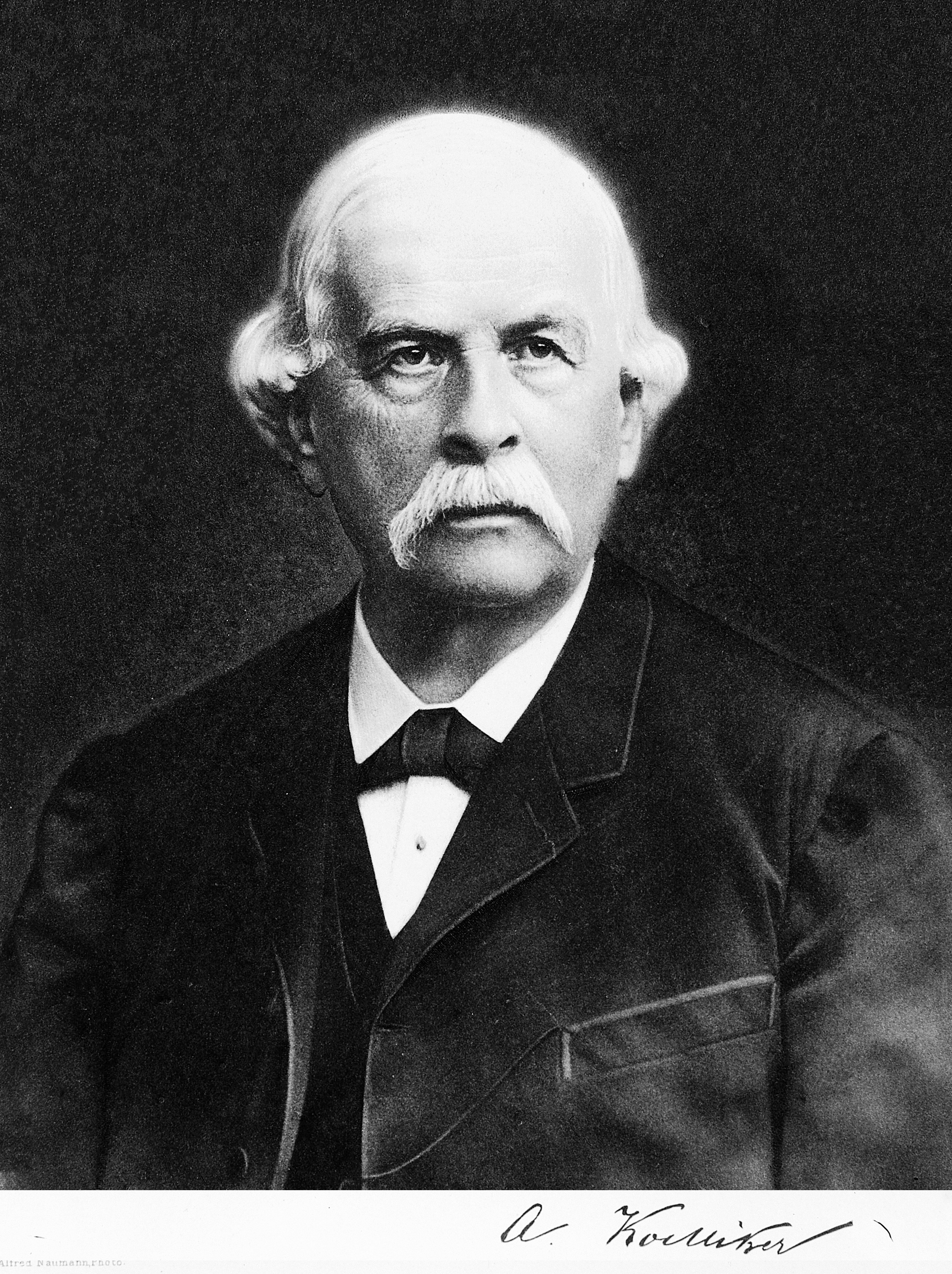
Rudolph Albert von Kölliker revived Geoffroy's saltationist ideas, calling his theory heterogenesis. It depended on a nonmaterial directive force (orthogenesis).

Thomas Henry Huxley warned Darwin that he had taken on "an unnecessary difficulty in adopting Natura non facit saltum ["Nature does not take leaps"] so unreservedly." Huxley feared this assumption could discourage naturalists (catastrophists) who believed that major leaps and cataclysms played a significant role in the history of life.

=== von Kölliker's heterogenesis, 1864 ===
In 1864 Albert von Kölliker revived Geoffroy's theory that evolution proceeds by large steps, under the name of heterogenesis, but this time assuming the influence of a nonmaterial force (Note: Orthogenesis, possibly vitalism.) to direct the course of evolution.

=== Galton's "sports", 1892 ===
Darwin's cousin, Francis Galton, considered Darwin's evidence for evolution, and came to an opposite conclusion about the type of variation on which natural selection must act. He carried out his own experiments and published a series of papers and books setting out his views. Already by 1869 when he published Hereditary Genius, he believed in evolution by saltation. In his 1889 book Natural Inheritance he argued that natural selection would benefit from accepting that the steps need not, as Darwin had stated, be minute. In his 1892 book Finger Prints, he stated directly that "The progress of evolution is not a smooth and uniform progression, but one that proceeds by jerks, through successive 'sports' (as they are called), some of them implying considerable organic changes; and each in its turn being favoured by Natural Selection".

From 1860 to 1880 saltation had been a minority viewpoint, to the extent that Galton felt his writings were being universally ignored. By 1890 it became a widely held theory, and his views helped to launch a major controversy.

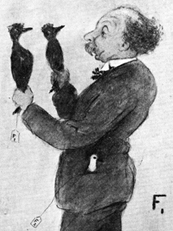
Drawing of William Bateson, 1909, by the biologist Dennis G. Lillie

=== Bateson's discontinuous variation, 1894 ===
William Bateson's 1894 book Materials for the Study of Variation, Treated with Especial Regard to Discontinuity in the Origin of Species marked the arrival of mutationist thinking, before the rediscovery of Mendel's laws. He examined discontinuous variation (implying a form of saltation) where it occurred naturally, following William Keith Brooks, Galton, Thomas Henry Huxley and St. George Jackson Mivart.

== Early 20th century mutationism ==
=== De Vries and Mendelian mutationstheorie, 1901 ===
The main principle of the mutation theory is that species and varieties have originated by mutation, but are, at present, not known to have originated in any other way. — Hugo de Vries

Hugo de Vries's careful 1901 studies of wild variants of the evening primrose Oenothera lamarckiana showed that distinct new forms could arise suddenly in nature, apparently at random, and could be propagated for many generations without dissipation or blending. He gave such changes the name "mutation". (Note: The changes in the evening primrose were later shown to be caused by chromosome duplications (polyploidy) rather than gene mutation.) By this, de Vries meant that a new form of the plant was created in a single step (not the same as a mutation in the modern sense); no long period of natural selection was required for speciation, and nor was reproductive isolation. In the view of the historian of science Peter J. Bowler, De Vries used the term to mean

large-scale genetic changes capable of producing a new subspecies, or even species, instantaneously.

The historian of science Betty Smocovitis described mutationism as:

the case of purported saltatory evolution that Hugo de Vries had mistakenly interpreted for the evening primrose, Oenothera.

De Vries set out his position, known as Mutationstheorie (mutation theory) on the creative nature of mutation in his 1905 book Species and Varieties: their Origin by Mutation. In the view of the historian of science Edward Larson, de Vries was the person largely responsible for transforming Victorian era saltationism into early 20th century mutation theory, "and in doing so pushed Darwinism near the verge of extinction as a viable scientific theory".

Similar ideas were propounded in Imperial Russia, even before De Vries, by Sergey Korzhinsky.

=== Johannsen's "pure line" experiments, 1903 ===
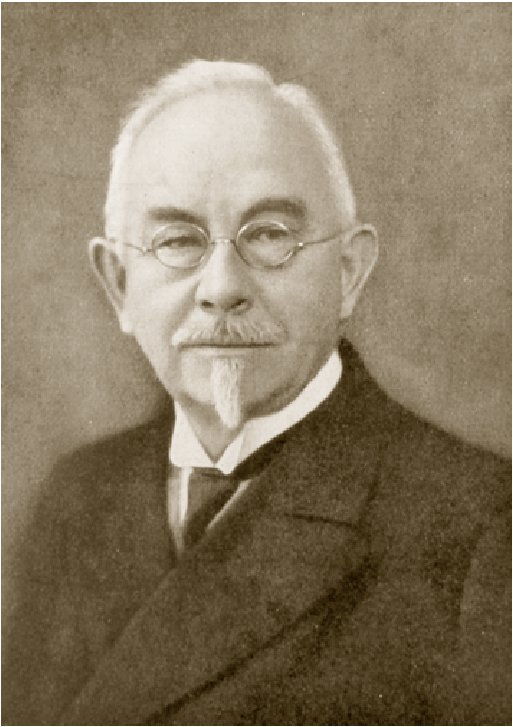
Wilhelm Johannsen's "pure line" experiments seemed to show that evolution could not work on continuous variation.

In the early 1900s, Darwin's mechanism of natural selection was understood by believers in continuous variation, principally the biometricians Walter Weldon and Karl Pearson, to be able to work on a continuously varying characteristic, whereas de Vries argued that selection on such characteristics would be ineffective. Wilhelm Johannsen's "pure line" experiments on Phaseolus vulgaris beans appeared to refute this mechanism. Using the true-breeding Princess variety of bean, carefully inbred within weight classes, Johannsen's work appeared to support de Vries. The offspring had a smooth random distribution. Johanssen believed that his results showed that continuous variability was not inherited, so evolution must rely on discontinuous mutations, as de Vries had argued. Johanssen published his work in Danish in a 1903 paper Om arvelighed i samfund og i rene linier (On inheritance in populations and in pure lines), and in his 1905 book Arvelighedslærens Elementer (The Elements of Heredity).

=== Punnett's mimicry, 1915 ===
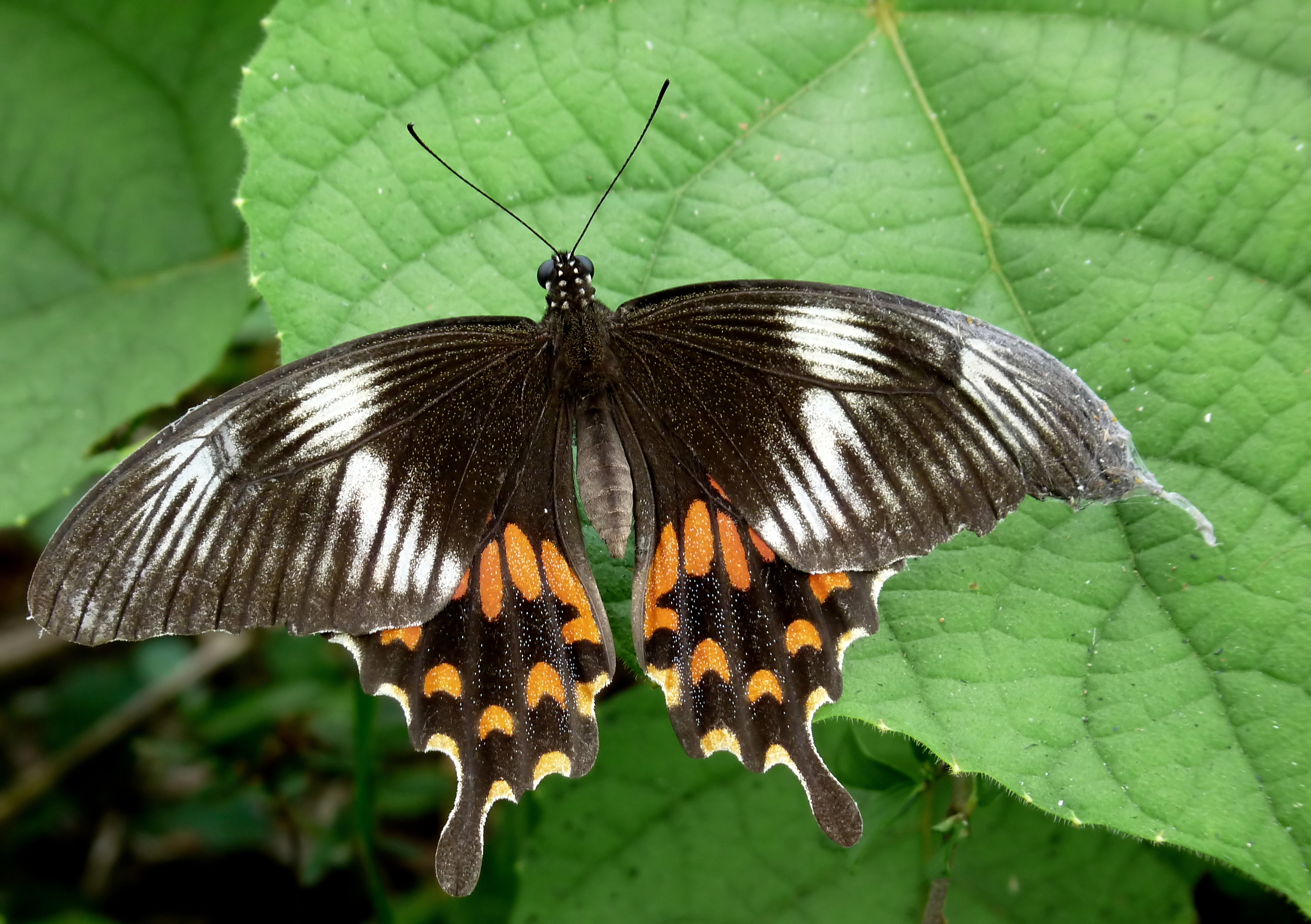
Papilio polytes has 3 forms with differing wing patterns, here the "Romulus" morph. Reginald Punnett argued that this polymorphism demonstrated discontinuous evolution. However, Ronald Fisher showed that this could have arisen by small changes in additional modifier genes.

In 1915, Reginald Punnett argued in his book Mimicry in Butterflies that the 3 morphs (forms) of the butterfly Papilio polytes, which mimic different host species of butterfly, demonstrated discontinuous evolution in action. The different forms existed in a stable polymorphism controlled by 2 Mendelian factors (genes). The alleles of these genes were certainly discontinuous, so Punnett supposed that they must have evolved in discontinuous leaps.

== The undermining of mutationism ==
=== Yule's analysis of Mendelism and continuous variation, 1902 ===
The undermining of mutationism began almost at once, in 1902, as the statistician Udny Yule analysed Mendel's theory and showed that given full dominance of one allele over another, a 3:1 ratio of alleles would be sustained indefinitely. This meant that the recessive allele could remain in the population with no need to invoke mutation. He also showed that given multiple factors, Mendel's theory enabled continuous variation, as indeed Mendel had suggested, removing the central plank of the mutationist theory, and criticised Bateson's confrontational approach. However, the "excellent" paper did not prevent the Mendelians and the biometricians from falling out.

=== Nilsson-Ehle's experiments on Mendelian inheritance and continuous variation, 1908 ===
The Swedish geneticist H. Nilsson-Ehle demonstrated in 1908, in a paper published in German in a Swedish journal, Einige Ergebnisse von Kreuzungen bei Hafer und Weizen (Observations on Crosses in Oats and Wheat), that continuous variation could readily be produced by multiple Mendelian genes. He found numerous Mendelian 3:1 ratios, implying a dominant and a recessive allele, in oats and wheat; a 15:1 ratio for a cross of oat varieties with black and white glumes respectively, implying two pairs of alleles (two Mendelian factors); and that crossing a red-grained Swedish velvet wheat with a white one gave in the third (F3) generation the complex signature of ratios expected of three factors at once, with 37 grains giving only red offspring, 8 giving 63:1 in their offspring, 12 giving 15:1, and 6 giving 3:1. There weren't any grains giving all white, but as he had only expected 1 of those in his sample, 0 was not an unlikely outcome. Genes could clearly combine in almost infinite combinations: ten of his factors allowed for almost 60,000 different forms, with no need to suppose that any new mutations were involved. The results implied that natural selection would work on Mendelian genes, helping to bring about the unification of Darwinian evolution and genetics.

Similar work in America by Edward East on maize in 1910 showed the same thing for biologists without access to Nilsson-Ehle's work. On the same theme, the mathematician Ronald Fisher published "The Correlation Between Relatives on the Supposition of Mendelian Inheritance" in 1918, again showing that continuous variation could readily be produced by multiple Mendelian genes. It showed, too, that Mendelian inheritance had no essential link with mutationism: Fisher stressed that small variations (per gene) would be sufficient for natural selection to drive evolution.

=== Castle's selection experiments on hooded rats, 1911 ===
Starting in 1906, William Castle carried out a long study of the effect of selection on coat colour in rats. The piebald or hooded pattern was recessive to the grey wild type. He crossed hooded rats with the black-backed Irish type, and then back-crossed the offspring with pure hooded rats. The dark stripe on the back was bigger. He then tried selecting different groups for bigger or smaller stripes for 5 generations, and found that it was possible to change the characteristics way beyond the initial range of variation. This effectively refuted de Vries's claim that continuous variation could not be inherited permanently, requiring new mutations. By 1911 Castle noted that the results could be explained by Darwinian selection on heritable variation of Mendelian genes.

=== Morgan's small Mendelian genes in Drosophila, 1912 ===
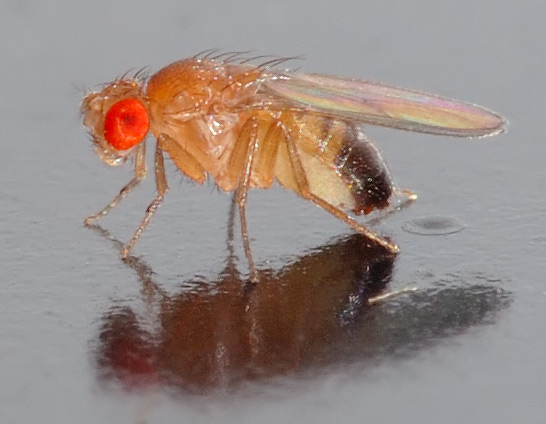
Thomas Hunt Morgan's work on Drosophila melanogaster found many small Mendelian factors for natural selection to work on.

By 1912, after years of work on the genetics of Drosophila fruit flies, Thomas Hunt Morgan showed that these animals had many small Mendelian factors on which Darwinian evolution could work as if variation was fully continuous. The way was open for geneticists to conclude that Mendelism supported Darwinism.

=== Muller's balanced lethal explanation of Oenothera "mutations", 1918 ===
De Vries's mutationism was dealt a serious if not fatal blow in 1918 by the American geneticist Hermann Joseph Muller. He compared the behaviour of balanced lethals in Drosophila with De Vries's supposed mutations in Oenothera, showing that they could work the same way. No actual mutations were involved, but infrequent chromosome crossovers accounted for the sudden appearance of traits which had been present in the genes all along.

=== Fisher's explanation of polymorphism, 1927 ===
In 1927, Fisher explicitly attacked Punnett's 1915 theory of discontinuous evolution of mimicry. Fisher argued that selection acting on genes making small modifications to the butterfly's phenotype (its appearance) would allow the multiple forms of a polymorphism to be established.

== Later mutationist theories ==
The understanding that Mendelian genetics could both preserve discrete variations indefinitely, and support continuous variation for natural selection to work on gradually, meant that most biologists from around 1918 onwards accepted natural selection as the driving force of evolution. Mutationism and other alternatives to evolution by natural selection did not however vanish entirely.

=== Berg's nomogenesis, 1922 ===
Lev Berg proposed a combination of mutationism and directed (orthogenetic) evolution in his 1922 book Nomogenesis; or, Evolution Determined by Law. He used evidence from paleontology, zoology, and botany to argue that natural selection had limitations which set a direction for evolution. He claimed that speciation was caused by "mass transformation of a great number of individuals" by directed mass mutations.

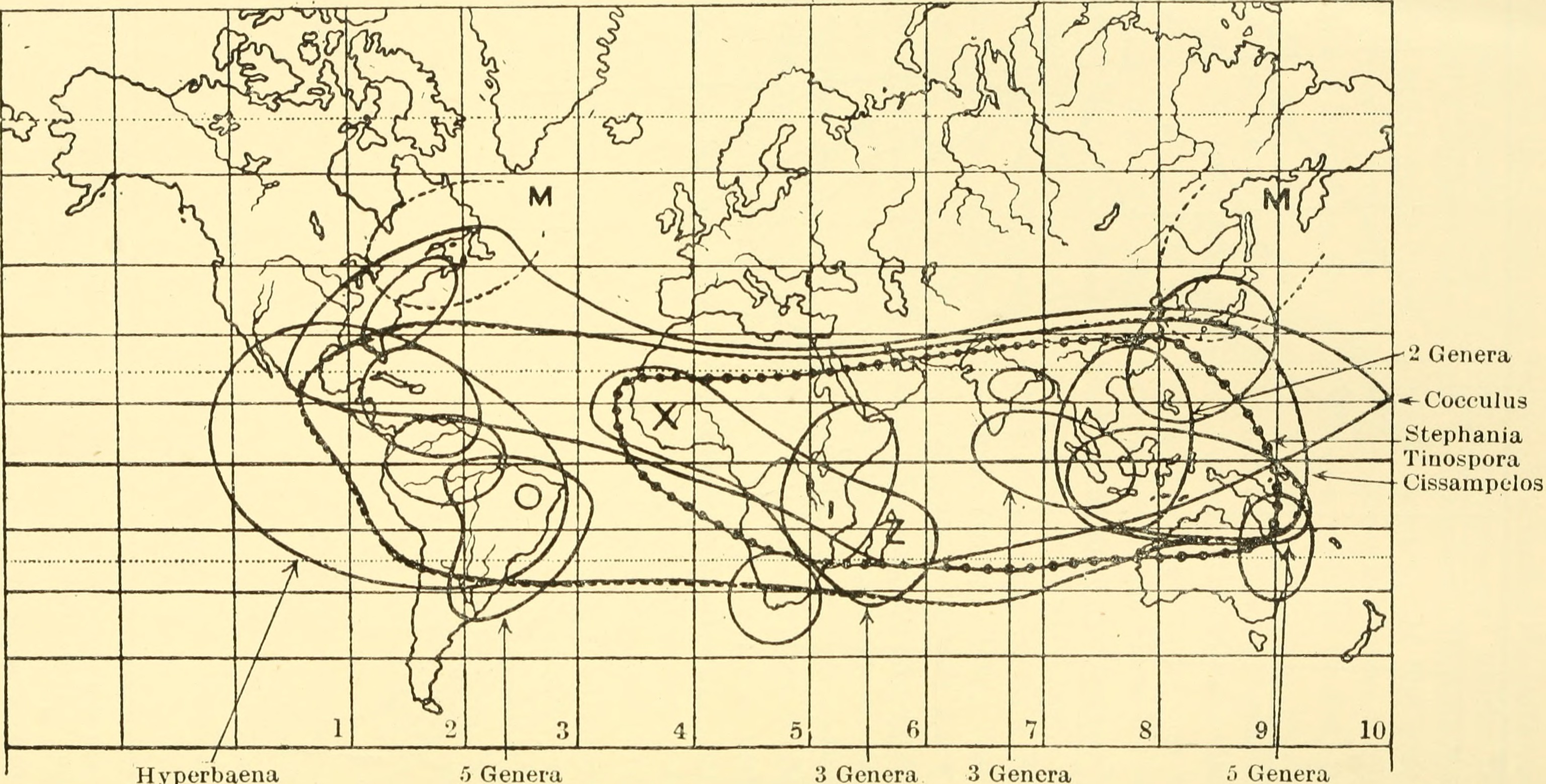
John Christopher Willis's The Course of Evolution by Differentiation Or Divergent Mutation Rather Than by Selection, 1940

=== Willis's macromutations, 1923 ===
In 1923, the botanist John Christopher Willis proposed that species were formed by large mutations, not gradual evolution by natural selection, and that evolution was driven by orthogenesis, which he called "differentiation", rather than by natural selection.

=== Goldschmidt's hopeful monsters, 1940 ===
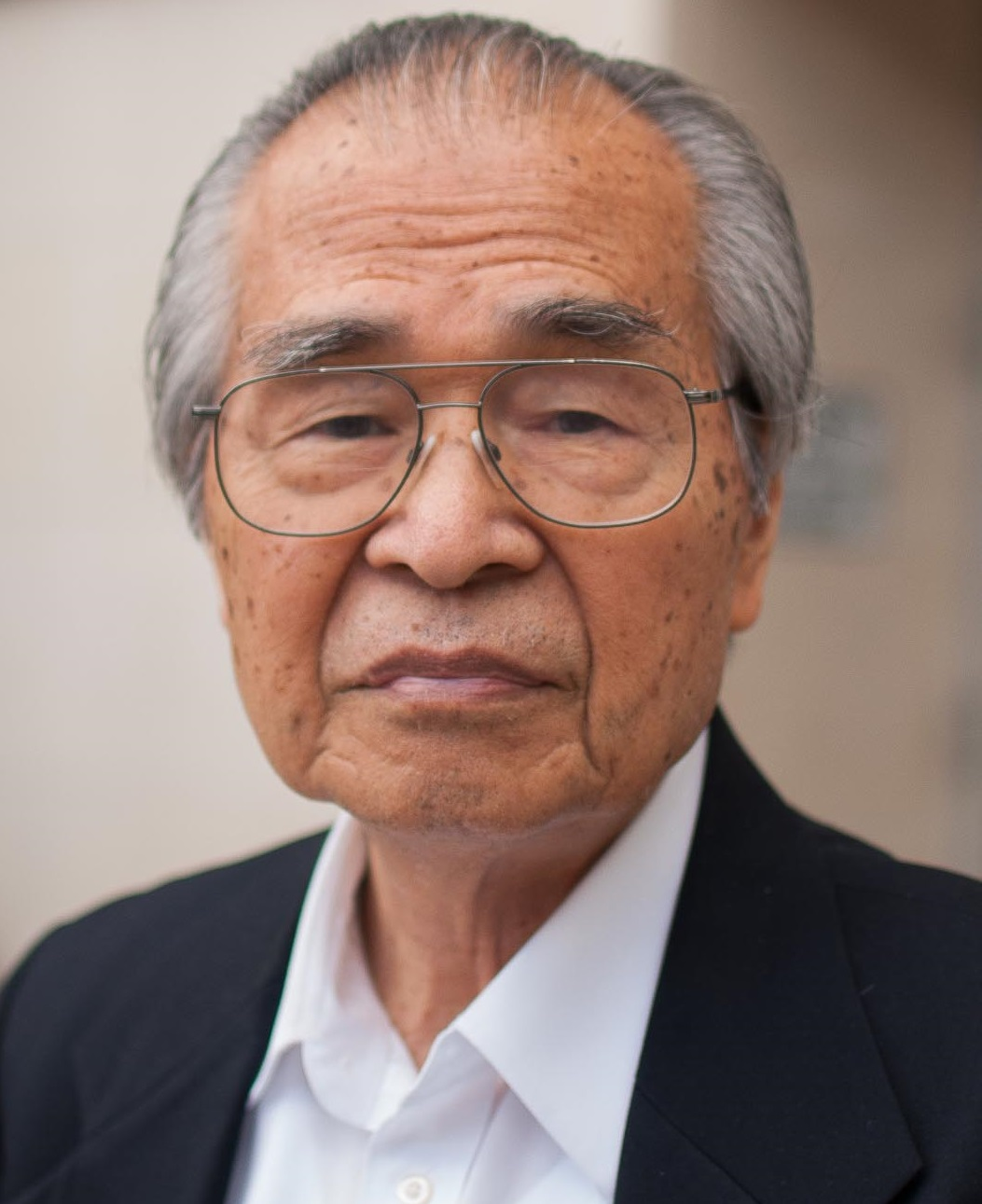
Masatoshi Nei argues that evolution is often mutation-limited.

In his 1940 book The Material Basis of Evolution, the German geneticist Richard Goldschmidt argued for single-step speciation by macromutation, describing the organisms thus produced as "hopeful monsters". Goldschmidt's thesis was universally rejected and widely ridiculed by biologists, who favoured the neo-Darwinian explanations of Fisher, J. B. S. Haldane and Sewall Wright. However, interest in Goldschmidt's ideas has reawakened in the field of evolutionary developmental biology.

=== Nei's mutation-driven evolution, 1987 ===
Contemporary biologists accept that mutation and selection both play roles in evolution; the mainstream view is that while mutation supplies material for selection in the form of variation, all non-random outcomes are caused by natural selection. Masatoshi Nei argues instead that the production of more efficient genotypes by mutation is fundamental for evolution, and that evolution is often mutation-limited. Nei's book received thoughtful reviews; while Wright rejected Nei's thinking as mistaken, Brookfield, Galtier, Weiss, Stoltzfus, and Wagner, although not necessarily agreeing with Nei's position, treated it as a relevant alternative view.

=== Contemporary approaches ===
Reviewing the history of macroevolutionary theories, the American evolutionary biologist Douglas J. Futuyma notes that since 1970, two very different alternatives to Darwinian gradualism have been proposed, both by Stephen Jay Gould: mutationism, and punctuated equilibria. Gould's macromutation theory gave a nod to his predecessor with an envisaged "Goldschmidt break" between evolution within a species and speciation. His advocacy of Goldschmidt was attacked with "highly unflattering comments" by Brian Charlesworth and Alan Templeton. Futuyma concludes, following other biologists reviewing the field such as K.Sterelny and A. Minelli, that essentially all the claims of evolution driven by large mutations could be explained within the Darwinian evolutionary synthesis. James A. Shapiro's claim that molecular genetics undermines Darwinism has been described as mutationism and an extreme view by the zoologist Andy Gardner.

Cases of mutation bias are cited by mutationism advocates of the extended evolutionary synthesis who have argued that mutation bias is an entirely novel evolutionary principle. This viewpoint has been criticized by Erik Svensson. A 2019 review by Svensson and David Berger concluded that "we find little support for mutation bias as an independent force in adaptive evolution, although it can interact with selection under conditions of small population size and when standing genetic variation is limited, entirely consistent with standard evolutionary theory." In contrast to Svensson and Berger a 2023 review by Arlin Stoltzfus and colleagues concluded that there is strong empirical evidence and theoretical arguments that mutation bias has predictable effects on genetic changes fixed in adaptation.

== Historiography ==
Biologists at the start of the 20th century broadly agreed that evolution occurred, but felt that the mechanisms suggested by Darwin, including natural selection, would be ineffective. Large mutations looked likely to drive evolution quickly, and avoided the difficulty which had rightly worried Darwin, namely that blending inheritance would average out any small favourable changes. (Note: Mendelian inheritance, with discrete alleles, solves Darwin's problem, as blending does not occur.) Further, large saltatory mutation, able to create species in a single step, offered a ready explanation of why the fossil record should contain large discontinuities and times of rapid change.

These discoveries were often framed by supporters of the mid-20th century modern synthesis, such as Julian Huxley and Ernst Mayr, as a controversy between the early geneticists—the "Mendelians"—including Bateson, Johannsen, de Vries, Morgan, and Punnett, who advocated Mendelism and mutation, and were understood as opponents of Darwin's original gradualist view, and the biometricians such as Pearson and Weldon, who opposed Mendelism and were more faithful to Darwin. In this version, little progress was made during the eclipse of Darwinism, and the debate between mutationist geneticists such as de Vries and biometricians such as Pearson ended with the victory of the modern synthesis between about 1918 and 1950. According to this account, the new population genetics of the 1940s demonstrated the explanatory power of natural selection, while mutationism, alongside other non-Darwinian approaches such as orthogenesis and structuralism, was essentially abandoned. This view became dominant in the second half of the 20th century, and was accepted by both biologists and historians.

A more recent view, advocated by the historians Arlin Stoltzfus and Kele Cable, is that Bateson, de Vries, Morgan and Punnett had by 1918 formed a synthesis of Mendelism and mutationism. The understanding achieved by these geneticists spanned the action of natural selection on alleles (alternative forms of a gene), the Hardy–Weinberg equilibrium, the evolution of continuously-varying traits (like height), and the probability that a new mutation will become fixed. In this view, the early geneticists accepted natural selection alongside mutation, but rejected Darwin's non-Mendelian ideas about variation and heredity, and the synthesis began soon after 1900. The traditional claim that Mendelians rejected the idea of continuous variation outright is simply false; as early as 1902, Bateson and Edith Saunders wrote that "If there were even so few as, say, four or five pairs of possible allelomorphs, the various homo- and hetero-zygous combinations might, on seriation, give so near an approach to a continuous curve, that the purity of the elements would be unsuspected".

Historians have interpreted the history of mutationism in different ways. The classical view is that mutationism, opposed to Darwin's gradualism, was an obvious error; the decades-long delay in synthesizing genetics and Darwinism is an "inexplicable embarrassment"; genetics led logically to the modern synthesis and mutationism was one of several anti-Darwinian "blind alleys" separate from the main line leading from Darwin to the present. A revisionist view is that mutationists accepted both mutation and selection, with broadly the same roles they have today, and early on accepted and indeed offered a correct explanation for continuous variation based on multiple genes, paving the way for gradual evolution. At the time of the Darwin centennial in Cambridge in 1909, mutationism and Lamarckism were contrasted with natural selection as competing ideas; 50 years later, at the 1959 University of Chicago centennial of the publication of On the Origin of Species, mutationism was no longer seriously considered.

== See also ==
- History of evolutionary thought
- Rapid modes of evolution

== Sources ==
- Allen, Garland E. (1968). "Thomas Hunt Morgan and the problem of natural selection". Journal of the History of Biology. 1 (1): 113–139. doi:10.1007/BF00149778. S2CID 84932356.
- Bateman, Richard M.; DiMichele, William A. (2002). Generating and Filtering Major Phenotypic Novelties, NeoGoldschmidtian Saltation Revisited. In Cronk, Q. C. B.; Bateman R. M.; Hawkins J. A. eds. Developmental Genetics and Plant Evolution. London: Taylor and Francis. pp. 109–159.
- Bowler, Peter J. (2003) [1983]. Evolution:The History of an Idea (New ed.). University of California Press. ISBN 978-0-520-23693-6.
- Bowler, Peter J. (1989) [1983]. Evolution:The History of an Idea (Revised ed.). University of California Press. ISBN 978-0-520-06386-0.
- Bateson, William. (1894). Materials for the Study of Variation: Treated with Especial Regard to Discontinuity in the Origin of Species. Macmillan.
- Endersby, Jim (2007). A Guinea Pig's History of Biology. Harvard University Press. ISBN 978-0-674-02713-8.
- Gayon, J. (1988). Darwinism's Struggle for Survival: Heredity and the Hypothesis of Natural Selection. Cambridge University Press.
- Larson, Edward J. (2004). Evolution: The Remarkable History of a Scientific Theory. Random House. ISBN 978-1-58836-538-5.
- Provine, W. B. (2001). The Origins of Theoretical Population Genetics, with a new afterword. University of Chicago Press, Chicago.
- Ruse, Michael (1996). Monad to Man: the Concept of Progress in Evolutionary Biology. Harvard University Press. ISBN 978-0-674-03248-4.
- Smocovitis, Vassiliki Betty (1996). Unifying Biology: The Evolutionary Synthesis and Evolutionary Biology. Vol. 25. Princeton, New Jersey: Princeton University Press. pp. 1–65. doi:10.1007/bf01947504. ISBN 978-0-691-03343-3. LCCN 96005605. OCLC 34411399. PMID 11623198. S2CID 189833728.
