= John Christopher Willis =

English botanist (1868–1958)

- Born: 20 February 1868
- Died: 21 March 1958 (aged 90)
- Education: University College, Liverpool; Gonville and Caius College, Cambridge
- Awards: Fellow of the Royal Society; Darwin-Wallace Medal (Silver, 1958)
- Scientific career
- Fields: Botany
- Workplaces: Royal Botanical Gardens, Peradeniya

John Christopher Willis FRS (20 February 1868 – 21 March 1958) was an English botanist known for his Age and Area hypothesis and criticism of natural selection.

== Education ==
Born in Liverpool, he was educated at and University College, Liverpool (biology) and Gonville and Caius College, Cambridge (botany).

== Career ==
In 1896 Willis was appointed director of the Royal Botanical Gardens, Peradeniya, Ceylon (now Sri Lanka) until 1912 when he was appointed director of the botanic gardens at Rio de Janeiro. He was elected a Fellow of the Linnean Society in 1897, and a Fellow of the Royal Society in 1919. His notable publications include "A Manual and Dictionary of the Flowering Plants and Ferns" in two volumes and "Age and Area: A Study of Geographical Distribution and Origin of Species”, published in 1922. He returned to Cambridge in 1915, and later went to live in Montreux, Switzerland. He died in 1958 at the age of 90 and was posthumously awarded the Darwin–Wallace Medal by the Linnean Society.

In 1901, botanist Johannes Eugenius Bülow Warming published Willisia, which is a genus of flowering plants from India and Bangladesh belonging to the family Podostemaceae. It was named in John Christopher Willis's honour.

== Age and Area hypothesis ==
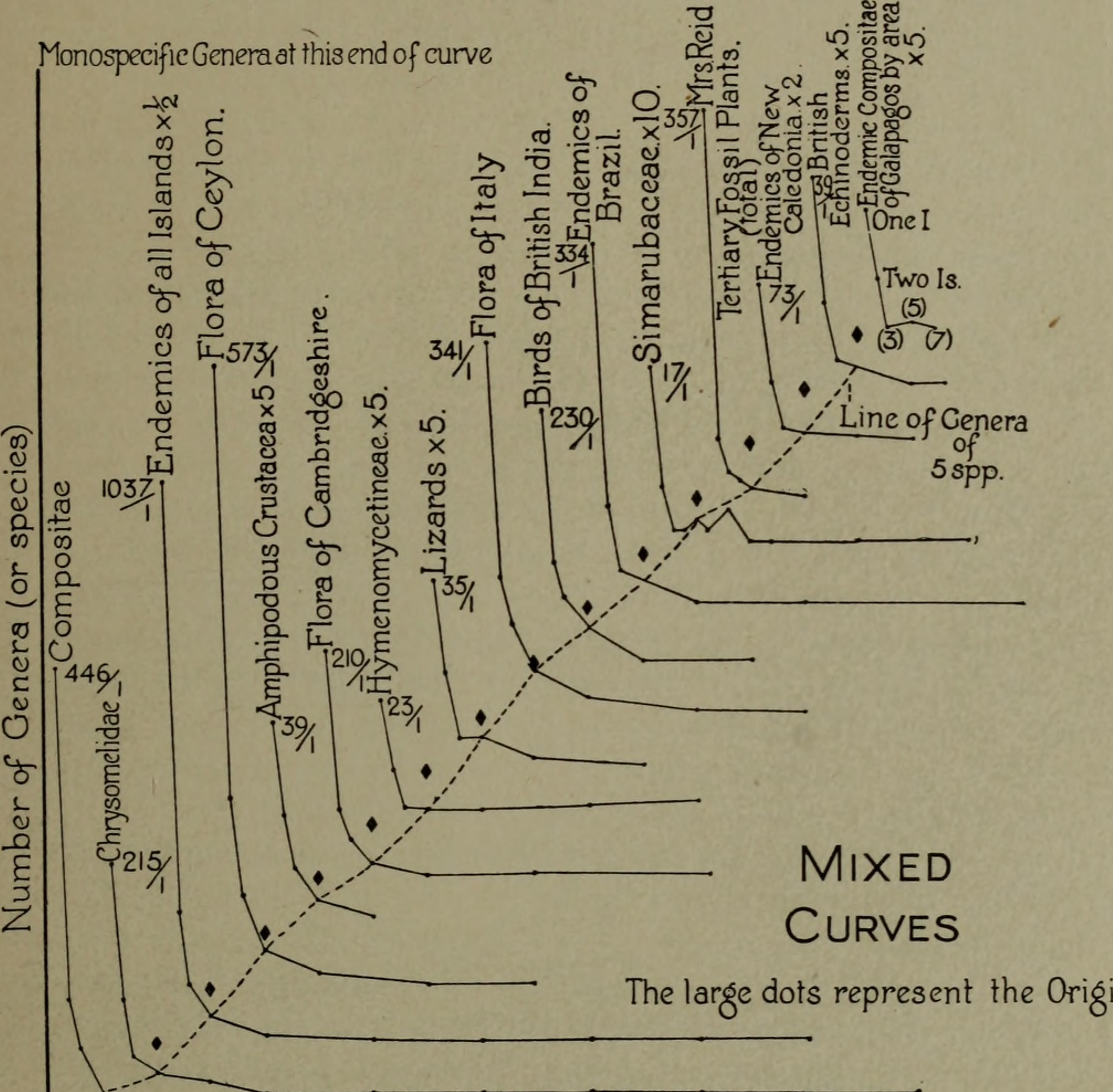
Age and Area, by J. C. Willis

Willis formed the Age and Area hypothesis during botanical field work in Ceylon where he studied the distributional patterns of the Ceylonese vascular plants in great detail. According to his hypothesis the extent of range of a species may be used as an indication of the age of that species. He also maintained that the "dying out" of species occurs rarely, and that new forms arise by mutation rather than by local adaptation through natural selection. Willis defined his hypothesis as:

The area occupied at any given time, in any given country, by any group of allied species at least ten in number, depends chiefly, so long as conditions remain reasonably constant, upon the ages of the species of that group in that country, but may be enormously modified by the presence of barriers such as seas, rivers, mountains, changes of climates from one region to the next, or other ecological boundaries, and the like, also by the action of man, and by other causes.

The Dutch botanist and geneticist Hugo de Vries supported the hypothesis; however, it was criticised by the American palaeontologist Edward W. Berry who wrote it was contradicted by palaeontological evidence. Edmund W. Sinnott rejected the hypothesis and wrote "other factors than age share in the area occupied by a species". According to Sinnott factors inherent in the plant such as hardiness, adaptability and growth play an important part in determining distribution. Willis published the book Age and Area. A Study in Geographical Distribution and Origin of Species in 1922. The American entomologist Philip P. Calvert documented examples of the geographical distribution of insects that contradicted the hypothesis in a paper in 1923. On the subject in 1924, Berry wrote:

Willis' ideas, it seems to me, are embalmed in a very complicated style, and he makes a great many assertions which are not and can not be substantiated. He claims that the distribution of any species of plant or animal is due solely to the length of time that the species has been in existence, and is not at all dependent on any advantages which it may possess in such matters as production, viability, or dispersal of seeds. Success in life is not dependent on the character of the roots, the nature of the conducting or storage tissues, the form and character of the leaves, the nature of the flowers, or on any other morphological or physiological structures or functions, but is solely a matter of age. In other words, Willis does not believe in those processes which may be grouped under the term adaptation, and he, of course, has no use for natural selection.

In 1924, the American botanist Merritt Lyndon Fernald wrote that studies on floras of the Northern Hemisphere do not support the Age and Area hypothesis. Willis responded to the early criticisms and stated that his critics such as Berry and Sinnott had misrepresented his hypothesis. Willis claimed that his hypothesis should not be applied to single species but to groups of allied species. He wrote there was no rival hypothesis to his own to explain the botanical data and that his hypothesis had made successful predictions about flora distribution in New Zealand.

The American ecologist H. A. Gleason praised the hypothesis for being testable in the field of phytogeography but came to the conclusion that it could not account for migration data. In 1926 Willis wrote a paper defending his hypothesis and responded to the criticism. Most scientists, however, had rejected the hypothesis for various reasons and according to the historian of science Charles H. Smith "The "age and area" theory attracted some interest for about twenty years, but support for it was clearly on the wane by the time of Willis's late books The Course of Evolution and The Birth and Spread of Plants (though each of these works contained some interesting ideas)."

=== The Course of Evolution ===
Willis published a controversial book on evolution The Course of Evolution by Differentiation Or Divergent Mutation Rather Than by Selection (1940) which was a sequel to his Age and Area. Willis questioned the adequacy of natural selection of chance variations as a major factor in evolution. He supported mutations as the main mechanism of evolution, and chromosome alterations to be largely responsible for mutations. He opposed Darwinian gradualism and favoured saltational evolution. The American ichthyologist Carl Leavitt Hubbs reviewed the book claiming Willis was advocating a form of orthogenesis:

Convinced of the failure of natural selection to explain the facts of evolution, distribution, ecology and economic botany, Willis has turned to a compelling internal force, which, "working upon some definite law that we do not yet comprehend" forces a whole population to vary in the same direction. Rather unwisely he names this force "'differentiation (orthogenesis)," and regards it as "a kind of compromise" between special creation and natural selection.

The American geneticist Sewall Wright similarly noted that Willis believed evolution was not the result of chance but an orthogenetic drive, and that he was a proponent of saltationism.

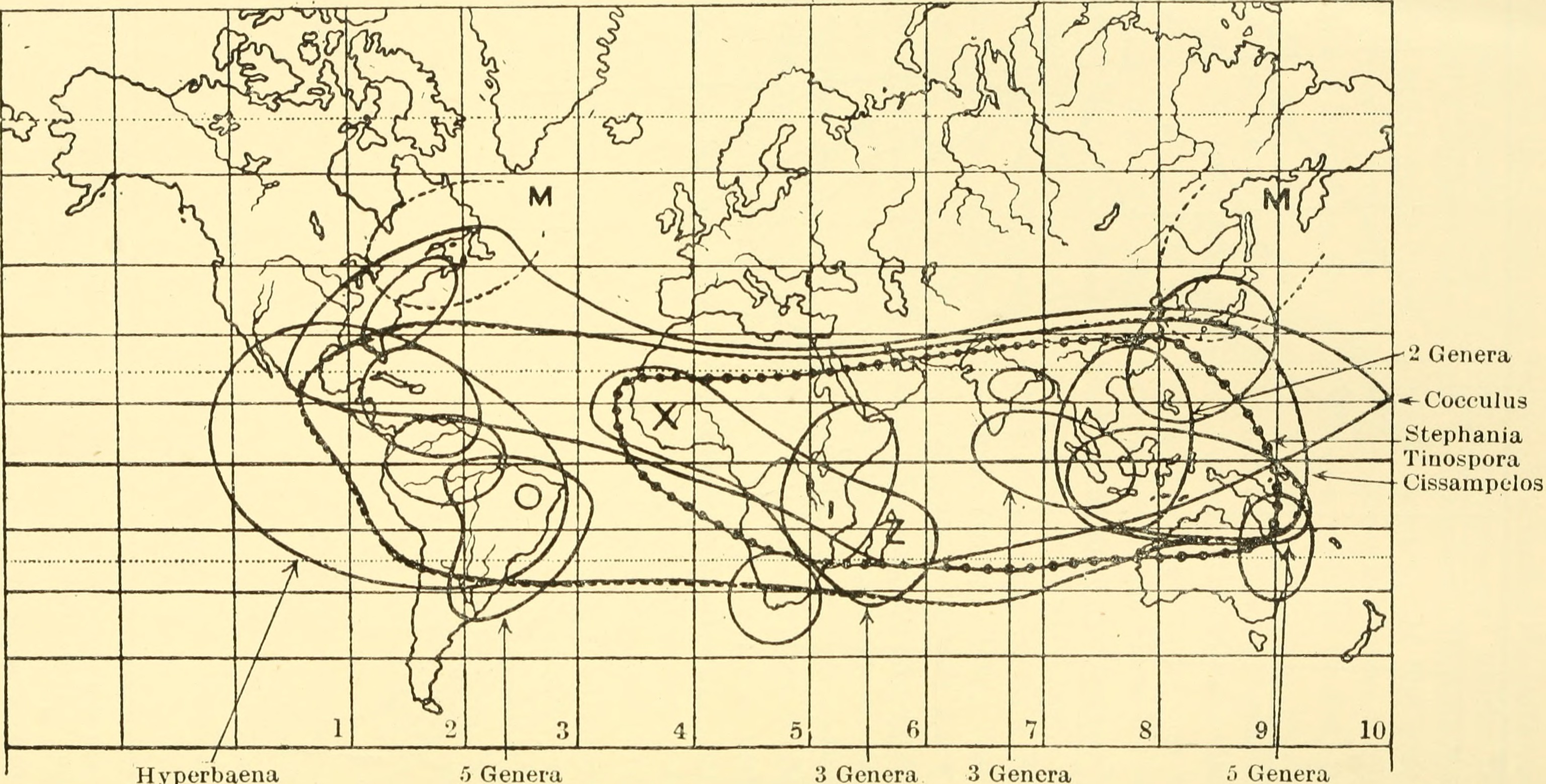
The Course of Evolution by Differentiation Or Divergent Mutation Rather Than by Selection

== Personal life ==
In 1897, Willis married Minnie Balldwin, daughter of T. Baldwin, and they had three daughters. His second daughter was the geographer Margaret Swainson Anderson who taught at Cambridge. His wife died in 1931.

== Publications ==
- Studies in the Morphology and Ecology of the Podostemaceæ of Ceylon and India (1902)
- A Manual and Dictionary of the Flowering Plants and Ferns (1908)
- The Distribution of Species in New Zealand (1916)
- The Relative Age of Endemic Species and Other Controversial Points (1917)
- Age and Area. A Study in Geographical Distribution and Origin of Species (1922)
- The Course of Evolution by Differentiation Or Divergent Mutation Rather Than by Selection (1940)
- The Birth and Spread of Plants (1949)
