= Saltation (biology) =

Sudden and large mutational change

In biology, saltation (from Latin saltus 'leap, jump') is a sudden and large mutational change from one generation to the next, potentially causing single-step speciation. This was historically offered as an alternative to Darwinism. Some forms of mutationism were effectively saltationist, implying large discontinuous jumps.

Speciation, such as by polyploidy in plants, can sometimes be achieved in a single and in evolutionary terms sudden step. Evidence exists for various forms of saltation in a variety of organisms.

== History ==
Prior to Charles Darwin most evolutionary scientists had been saltationists. Jean-Baptiste Lamarck was a gradualist but similar to other scientists of the period had written that saltational evolution was possible. Étienne Geoffroy Saint-Hilaire endorsed a theory of saltational evolution that "monstrosities could become the founding fathers (or mothers) of new species by instantaneous transition from one form to the next." Geoffroy wrote that environmental pressures could produce sudden transformations to establish new species instantaneously. In 1864 Albert von Kölliker revived Geoffroy's theory that evolution proceeds by large steps, under the name of heterogenesis.

With the publication of On the Origin of Species in 1859 Charles Darwin wrote that most evolutionary changes proceeded gradually.

From 1860 to 1880 saltation had a minority interest but by 1890 had become a major interest to scientists. In their paper on evolutionary theories in the 20th century Levit et al wrote:

The advocates of saltationism deny the Darwinian idea of slowly and gradually growing divergence of character as the only source of evolutionary progress. They would not necessarily completely deny gradual variation, but claim that cardinally new 'body plans' come into being as a result of saltations (sudden, discontinuous and crucial changes, for example, the series of macromutations). The latter are responsible for the sudden appearance of new higher taxa including classes and orders, while small variation is supposed to be responsible for the fine adaptations below the species level.

In the early 20th century a mechanism of saltation was proposed as large mutations. It was seen as a much faster alternative to the Darwinian concept of a gradual process of small random variations being acted on by natural selection. It was popular with early geneticists such as Hugo de Vries, who along with Carl Correns helped rediscover Gregor Mendel's laws of inheritance in 1900, William Bateson, a British zoologist who switched to genetics, and early in his career Thomas Hunt Morgan. Some of these geneticists developed it into the mutation theory of evolution. There was also a debate over accounts of the evolution of mimicry and if they could be explained by gradualism or saltation. The geneticist Reginald Punnett supported a saltational theory in his book Mimicry in Butterflies (1915).

The mutation theory of evolution held that species went through periods of rapid mutation, possibly as a result of environmental stress, that could produce multiple mutations, and in some cases completely new species, in a single generation. This mutationist view of evolution was later replaced by the reconciliation of Mendelian genetics with natural selection into a gradualistic framework for the neo-Darwinian synthesis. It was the emergence of population thinking in evolution which forced many scientists to adopt gradualism in the early 20th century. According to Ernst Mayr, it wasn't until the development of population genetics in the neo-Darwinian synthesis in the 1940s that demonstrated the explanatory power of natural selection that saltational views of evolution were largely abandoned.

Saltation was originally denied by the "modern synthesis" school of neo-Darwinism which favoured gradual evolution but has since been accepted due to recent evidence in evolutionary biology (see the current status section). In recent years there are some prominent proponents of saltation, including Carl Woese. Woese, and colleagues, suggested that the absence of RNA signature continuum between domains of bacteria, archaea, and eukarya constitutes a primary indication that the three primary organismal lineages materialized via one or more major evolutionary saltations from some universal ancestral state involving dramatic change in cellular organization that was significant early in the evolution of life, but in complex organisms gave way to the generally accepted Darwinian mechanisms. The geneticist Barbara McClintock introduced the idea of "jumping genes", chromosome transpositions that can produce rapid changes in the genome.

Saltational speciation, also known as abrupt speciation, is the discontinuity in a lineage that occurs through genetic mutations, chromosomal aberrations or other evolutionary mechanisms that cause reproductively isolated individuals to establish a new species population. Polyploidy, karyotypic fission, symbiogenesis and lateral gene transfer are possible mechanisms for saltational speciation.

== Macromutation theory ==
The botanist John Christopher Willis proposed an early saltationist theory of evolution. He held that species were formed by large mutations, not gradual evolution by natural selection.

The German geneticist Richard Goldschmidt was the first scientist to use the term "hopeful monster". Goldschmidt thought that small gradual changes could not bridge the hypothetical divide between microevolution and macroevolution. In his book The Material Basis of Evolution (1940) he wrote "the change from species to species is not a change involving more and more additional atomistic changes, but a complete change of the primary pattern or reaction system into a new one, which afterwards may again produce intraspecific variation by micromutation." Goldschmidt believed the large changes in evolution were caused by macromutations (large mutations). His ideas about macromutations became known as the hopeful monster hypothesis which is considered a type of saltational evolution.

Goldschmidt's thesis however was universally rejected and widely ridiculed within the biological community, which favored the neo-Darwinian explanations of R.A. Fisher, J. B. S. Haldane and Sewall Wright. However, there has been a recent interest in the ideas of Goldschmidt in the field of evolutionary developmental biology as some scientists are convinced he was partially correct.

Otto Schindewolf, a German paleontologist, also supported macromutations as part of his evolutionary theory. He was known for presenting an alternative interpretation of the fossil record based on his ideas of orthogenesis, saltational evolution and extraterrestrial impacts opposed to gradualism but abandoned the view of macromutations in later publications.

Søren Løvtrup, a biochemist and embryologist from Denmark, advocated a similar hypothesis of macromutation to Goldschmidt's in 1974. Lovtrup believed that macromutations interfered with various epigenetic processes, that is, those which affect the causal processes in biological development. This is in contrast to the gradualistic theory of micromutations of Neo-Darwinism, which claims that evolutionary innovations are generally the result of accumulation of numerous very slight modifications. Lovtrup also rejected the punctuated equilibria of Stephen Gould and Niles Eldredge, claiming it was a form of gradualism and not a macromutation theory. Lovtrup defended many of Darwin's critics including Schindewolf, Mivart, Goldschmidt, and Himmelfarb. Mae Wan Ho described Lovtrup's theory as similar to the hopeful monster theory of Richard Goldschmidt.

Goldschmidt presented two mechanisms for how hopeful monsters might work. One mechanism, involved "systemic mutations", rejected the classical gene concept and is no longer considered by modern science; however, his second mechanism involved "developmental macromutations" in "rate genes" or "controlling genes" that change early development and thus cause large effects in the adult phenotype. These kind of mutations are similar to the ones considered in contemporary evolutionary developmental biology.

On the subject of Goldschmidt Donald Prothero in his book Evolution: What the Fossils Say and Why It Matters (2007) wrote:

The past twenty years have vindicated Goldschmidt to some degree. With the discovery of the importance of regulatory genes, we realize that he was ahead of his time in focusing on the importance of a few genes controlling big changes in the organisms, not small-scales changes in the entire genome as neo-Darwinians thought. In addition, the hopeful monster problem is not so insurmountable after all. Embryology has shown that if you affect an entire population of developing embryos with a stress (such as a heat shock) it can cause many embryos to go through the same new pathway of embryonic development, and then they all become hopeful monsters when they reach reproductive age.

In 2008 evolutionary biologist Olivia Judson in her article The Monster Is Back, and It's Hopeful listed some examples which may support the hopeful monster hypothesis and an article published in the journal Nature in 2010 titled Evolution: Revenge of the Hopeful Monster reported that studies in stickleback populations in a British Columbia lake and bacteria populations in a Michigan lab have shown that large individual genetic changes can have vast effects on organisms "without dooming it to the evolutionary rubbish heap". According to the article "Single-gene changes that confer a large adaptive value do happen: they are not rare, they are not doomed and, when competing with small-effect mutations, they tend to win. But small-effect mutations still matter — a lot. They provide essential fine-tuning and sometimes pave the way for explosive evolution to follow."

A paper by (Page et al. 2010) have written that the Mexican axolotl (Ambystoma mexicanum) could be classified as a hopeful monster as it exhibits an adaptive and derived mode of development that has evolved rapidly and independently among tiger salamanders. According to the paper there has been an interest in aspects of the hopeful monster hypothesis in recent years:

Goldschmidt proposed that mutations occasionally yield individuals within populations that deviate radically from the norm and referred to such individuals as "hopeful monsters". If the novel phenotypes of hopeful monsters arise under the right environmental circumstances, they may become fixed, and the population will found a new species. While this idea was discounted during the Modern synthesis, aspects of the hopeful monster hypothesis have been substantiated in recent years. For example, it is clear that dramatic changes in phenotype can occur from few mutations of key developmental genes and phenotypic differences among species often map to relatively few genetic factors. These findings are motivating renewed interest in the study of hopeful monsters and the perspectives they can provide about the evolution of development. In contrast to mutants that are created in the lab, hopeful monsters have been shaped by natural selection and are therefore more likely to reveal mechanisms of adaptive evolution.

Günter Theissen, a German professor of genetics, has classified homeotic mutants as "hopeful monsters" and has documented many examples of animal and plant lineages that may have originated in that way. American biologist Michael Freeling has proposed "balanced gene drive" as a saltational mechanism in the mutationist tradition, which could explain trends involving morphological complexity in plant and animal eukaryotic lineages.

== Current status ==
=== Known mechanisms ===
Examples of saltational evolution include cases of stabilized hybrids that can reproduce without crossing (such as allotetraploids) and cases of symbiogenesis. Both gene duplication and lateral gene transfer have the capacity to bring about relatively large changes that are saltational. Polyploidy (most common in plants but not unknown in animals) is saltational: a significant change (in gene numbers) can result in speciation in a single generation.

=== Claimed instances ===
Evidence of phenotypic saltation has been found in the centipede and some scientists have suggested there is evidence for independent instances of saltational evolution in sphinx moths. Saltational changes have occurred in the buccal cavity of the roundworm Caenorhabditis elegans. Some processes of epigenetic inheritance can also produce changes that are saltational. There has been a controversy over whether mimicry in butterflies and other insects can be explained by gradual or saltational evolution. According to Norrström (2006) there is evidence for saltation in some cases of mimicry. The endosymbiotic theory is considered to be a type of saltational evolution. Symonds and Elgar, 2004 have suggested that pheromone evolution in bark beetles is characterized by large saltational shifts. The mode of evolution of sex pheromones in Bactrocera has occurred by rapid saltational changes associated with speciation followed by gradual divergence thereafter. Saltational speciation has been recognized in the genus Clarkia (Lewis, 1966). It has been suggested (Carr, 1980, 2000) that the Calycadenia pauciflora could have originated directly from an ancestral race through a single saltational event involving multiple chromosome breaks. Specific cases of homeosis in flowers can be caused by saltational evolution. In a study of divergent orchid flowers (Bateman and DiMichele, 2002) wrote how simple homeotic morphs in a population can lead to newly established forms that become fixed and ultimately lead to new species. They described the transformation as a saltational evolutionary process, where a mutation of key developmental genes leads to a profound phenotypic change, producing a new evolutionary lineage within a species.

=== Explanations ===
Reviewing the history of macroevolutionary theories, the American evolutionary biologist Douglas J. Futuyma notes that since 1970, two very different alternatives to Darwinian gradualism have been proposed, both by Stephen Jay Gould: mutationism, and punctuated equilibria. Gould's macromutation theory gave a nod to his predecessor with an envisaged "Goldschmidt break" between evolution within a species and speciation. His advocacy of Goldschmidt was attacked with "highly unflattering comments" by B. Charlesworth and Templeton. Futuyma concludes, following other biologists reviewing the field such as K.Sterelny and A. Minelli, that essentially all the claims of evolution driven by large mutations could be explained within the Darwinian evolutionary synthesis.

== See also ==
- Catastrophism
- Phyletic gradualism
- Rapid modes of evolution
- Leo S. Berg
- History of evolutionary thought
- Eclipse of Darwinism

== Sources ==
- Baker, Thomas C. (2002). Mechanism for saltational shifts in pheromone communication systems. Proceedings of the National Academy of Sciences. USA 99. 13368-13370.
- Bateman, Richard M.; DiMichele, William A. (2002). Generating and filtering major phenotypic novelties: neoGoldschmidtian saltation revisited. In: Cronk, Q. C. B.; Bateman R. M.; Hawkins, J. A. eds. Developmental genetics and plant evolution. London: Taylor & Francis. pp. 109–159.
- Hall, Brian K.; Pearson, Roy D. Müller, Gerd B. (2004). Environment, Development, and Evolution: Toward a Synthesis. MIT Press. ISBN 978-0262083195
- Kutschera, Ulrich; Niklas, Karl J. (2008). Macroevolution via secondary endosymbiosis: a Neo-Goldschmidtian view of unicellular hopeful monsters and Darwin's primordial intermediate form. Theory in Biosciences 127: 277-289.
- Merrell, David J. (1994). The Adaptive Seascape: The Mechanism of Evolution. University of Minnesota Press. ISBN 978-0816623488
- Schwartz, Jeffrey H. (2006). Sudden origins: a general mechanism of evolution based on stress protein concentration and rapid environmental change. The Anatomical Record. 289: 38–46.
- Gamberale-Stille, G.; Balogh, A. C.; Tullberg, B. S.; Leimar, O. (2012). Feature saltation and the evolution of mimicry. Evolution 66: 807-17.
- Theissen, Guenter. (2009). Saltational evolution: hopeful monsters are here to stay. Theory in Bioscience. 128, 43-51.
