= Margaret Swainson Anderson =

British educator, geographer (1902–1952)

Margaret Swainson Anderson (14 June 1902 – 15 September 1952) (née Willis) was a British educator, geographer and cartographer who taught at Girton College, part of the University of Cambridge, and became one of the first women appointed to an academic post at Cambridge in 1928.

== Biography ==
Margaret Willis was born 14 June 1902, in Barnsley, Yorkshire, England, the second of three daughters of botanist John Christopher Willis and Minnie Baldwin, who held a B.Sc. from University of London. Margaret went to the private girls school, Blackheath High School, located in southeast London, England. She then attended the Perse High School for Girls in Cambridge. She was enrolled as a student at Girton College from 1921 through 1925, graduating with a BA in 1924. Then she taught at Malvern Girls' College for a year before being appointed an Assistant Lecturer in Geography at the University of Manchester in 1926.

Women were not eligible for an appointment to Cambridge colleges until 1926. At Girton College, Anderson was first woman named to an academic post when she took the position of Demonstratorship in the Geography Department in 1928. She spent a sabbatical term in 1931 in South America.

=== Barbados years ===
In 1933, she resigned her positions and left England for Barbados to marry the engineer, Frank Cordue Anderson, who had become an old friend while Margaret lived in Cambridge. In 1935, now known as Margaret Swainson Anderson, she published a book about the birds of Barbados. The couple remained in Barbados until 1936.

On the island, Margaret and Frank Anderson were active in the local academic community and Margaret became a founding member of the Barbados Museum & Historical Society. One of their joint cartography projects was to map each of the island's roads, requiring the couple to travel each one. They adapted their map of the road "onto Admiralty Charts, the main form of cartography for the island." Margaret is listed as the sole author of the resulting publication.

=== World geographer ===
With the start of World War II, the couple returned to Cambridge, where Margaret worked as a Plotter, Eastern Regional HQ, Civil Defence, 1939–1940. She was named a lecturer in physical geography for the Royal Navy and Royal Air Force beginning in 1942. Soon thereafter, in 1944, she became geography studies director at her alma mater, Girton College. In 1948, she was elected to a staff fellowship at the same College and that year she became a university lecturer at Cambridge teaching human geography and climatology. Until her death, she remained at Girton teaching courses that included economic geography, biogeography, meteorology, climatology, vegetation and regional geography.

Throughout her life, she traveled widely, including throughout South America and the West Indies, and became a Fellow of the Royal Geographical Society.

Her obituary in The Geographical Journal said, 'Those of us who knew her will remember her as an able and loyal colleague, as a vivacious and lively companion, and as one who by her own high standards of scholarship and kindness set an example that other would like to follow, but will seldom be able to emulate'.

=== Personal life ===
In 1937, after her return to England, Margaret gave birth to a daughter, the botanist Margaret Cordue Anderson, called "Nan."

Margaret Swainson Anderson died 15 September 1952 at 50. "At the time of her death, her latest book, an anthology of travel, was in galley proof: it was published with the title Splendour of Earth by George Philip and Son Ltd in 1954, including her own introduction dating from circa June 1952."

Several boxes of papers attributed to Margaret are kept in the University of Cambridge Archives, however, the collections include material originating not only from Anderson but also her mother, her daughter and her husband.

== Selected works ==
- Anderson, Margaret Swainson. Geography of living things. Internet Archive. London, English Universities Press [1961].
- Anderson, Margaret S. "Splendour of Earth: An Anthology of Travel." The Geographical Journal 121, no. 2 (1955): 232.
- Margaret Swainson Anderson, Transactions and Papers of the Institute of British Geographers 18 (1952)
