= Willisia =

Scientific classification
- Kingdom: Plantae
- Clade: Tracheophytes
- Clade: Angiosperms
- Clade: Eudicots
- Clade: Rosids
- Order: Malpighiales
- Family: Podostemaceae
- Genus: Willisia; Warm.

Genus of flowering plants

Willisia is a genus of flowering plants belonging to the family Podostemaceae.

It is native to Bangladesh and India.

Known species:

- Willisia arekaliana Shivam. & Sadanand
- Willisia selaginoides (Bedd.) Warm. ex Wille

The genus name of Willisia is in honour of John Christopher Willis (1868–1958), an English botanist known for his 'Age and Area hypothesis' and his criticism of natural selection. It was first described and published in Kongel. Danske Vidensk. Selsk. Skr., Naturvidensk. Math. Afh., series 6, Vol.11 (1) on page 58 in 1901.
