= Hugo de Vries =

Dutch botanist (1848–1935)

Hugo de Vries ForMemRS HonFRSE
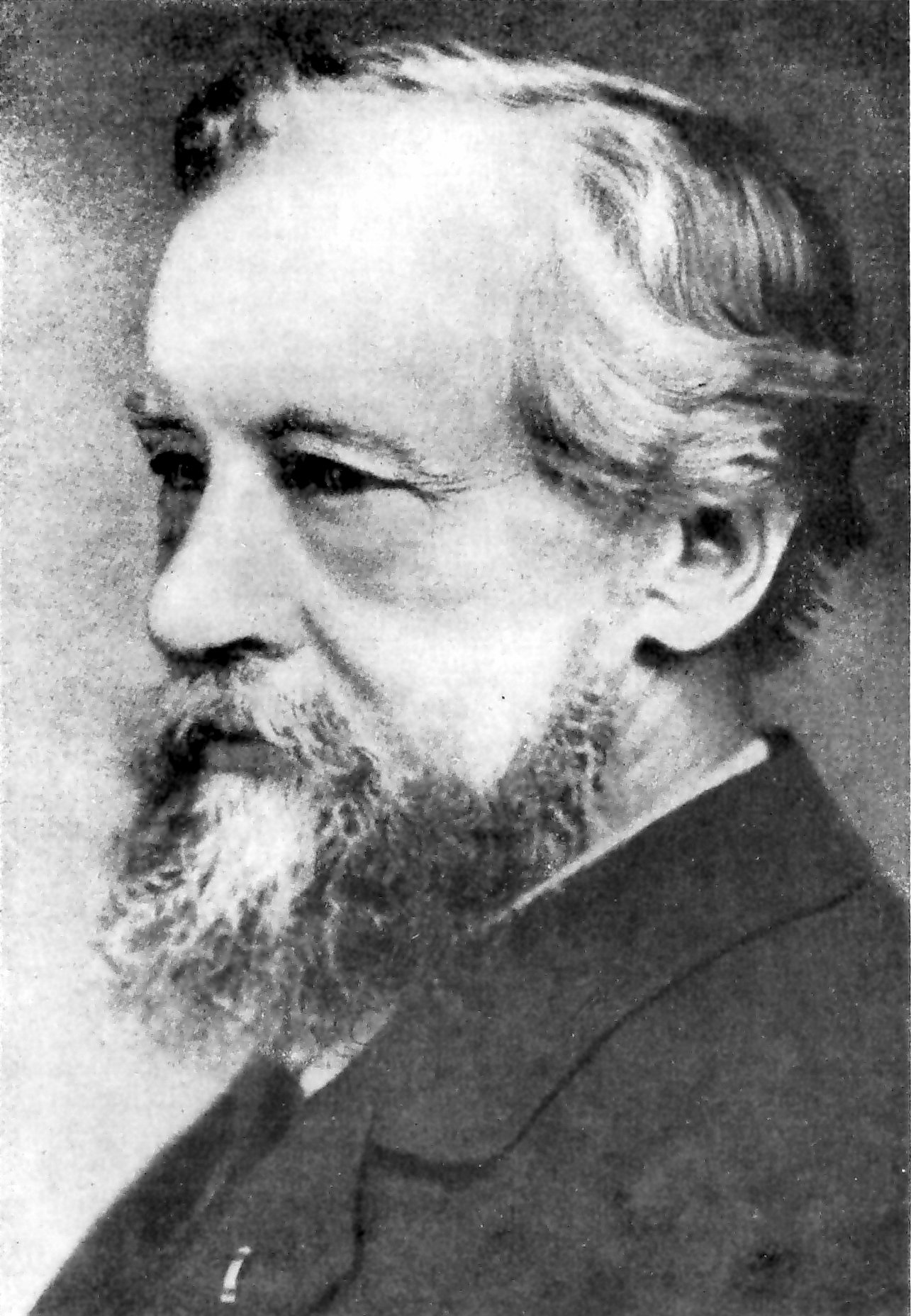
- de Vries c. 1907
- Born: Hugo Marie de Vries; 16 February 1848; Haarlem, Netherlands
- Died: 21 May 1935 (aged 87); Lunteren, Netherlands
- Scientific career
- Fields: Botany
- Workplaces: Leiden University
- Author abbrev. (botany): de Vries

Hugo Marie de Vries (Dutch: [ˈɦyɣoː də ˈvris]; 16 February 1848 – 21 May 1935) was a Dutch botanist and one of the first geneticists. He is known chiefly for suggesting the concept of genes, rediscovering the laws of heredity in the 1890s while apparently unaware of Gregor Mendel's work, for introducing the term "mutation", and for developing a mutation theory of evolution.

== Early life ==
De Vries was born in 1848, the eldest son of Gerrit de Vries (1818–1900), a lawyer and deacon in the Mennonite congregation in Haarlem and later Prime Minister of the Netherlands from 1872 until 1874, and Maria Everardina Reuvens (1823–1914), daughter of a professor in archaeology at Leiden University. His father became a member of the Dutch Council of State in 1862 and moved his family over to The Hague. From an early age Hugo showed much interest in botany, winning several prizes for his herbariums while attending gymnasium in Haarlem and The Hague.

In 1866 he enrolled at the Leiden University to major in botany. He enthusiastically took part in W.F.R. Suringar's classes and excursions, but was mostly drawn to the experimental botany outlined in Julius von Sachs' 'Lehrbuch der Botanik' from 1868. He was also deeply impressed by Charles Darwin's evolution theory, despite Suringar's skepticism. He wrote a dissertation on the effect of heat on plant roots, including several statements by Darwin to provoke his professor, and graduated in 1870.

== Early career ==
After a short period of teaching, de Vries left in September 1870 to take classes in chemistry and physics at the Heidelberg University and work in the laboratory of Wilhelm Hofmeister. In the second semester of that school year he joined the lab of the esteemed Julius Sachs in Würzburg to study plant growth. From September 1871 until 1875 he taught botany, zoology and geology at schools in Amsterdam. During each vacation he returned to the lab in Heidelberg to continue his research.

In 1875, the Prussian Ministry of Agriculture offered de Vries a position as professor at the still to be constructed Landwirtschaftliche Hochschule ("Royal Agricultural College") in Berlin. In anticipation, he moved back to Würzburg, where he studied agricultural crops and collaborated with Sachs. By 1877, Berlin's College was still only a plan, and he briefly took up a position teaching at the University of Halle-Wittenberg. The same year he was offered a position as lecturer in plant physiology at the newly founded University of Amsterdam. He was made adjunct professor in 1878 and full professor on his birthday in 1881, partly to keep him from moving to the Berlin College, which finally opened that year. De Vries was also professor and director of Amsterdam's Botanical Institute and Garden from 1885 to 1918.

== Definition of the gene ==
In 1889, de Vries published his book Intracellular Pangenesis, in which, based on a modified version of Charles Darwin's theory of Pangenesis of 1868, he postulated that different characters have different hereditary carriers. He specifically postulated that inheritance of specific traits in organisms comes in particles. He called these units pangenes, a term 20 years later to be shortened to genes by Wilhelm Johannsen.

== Rediscovery of genetics ==
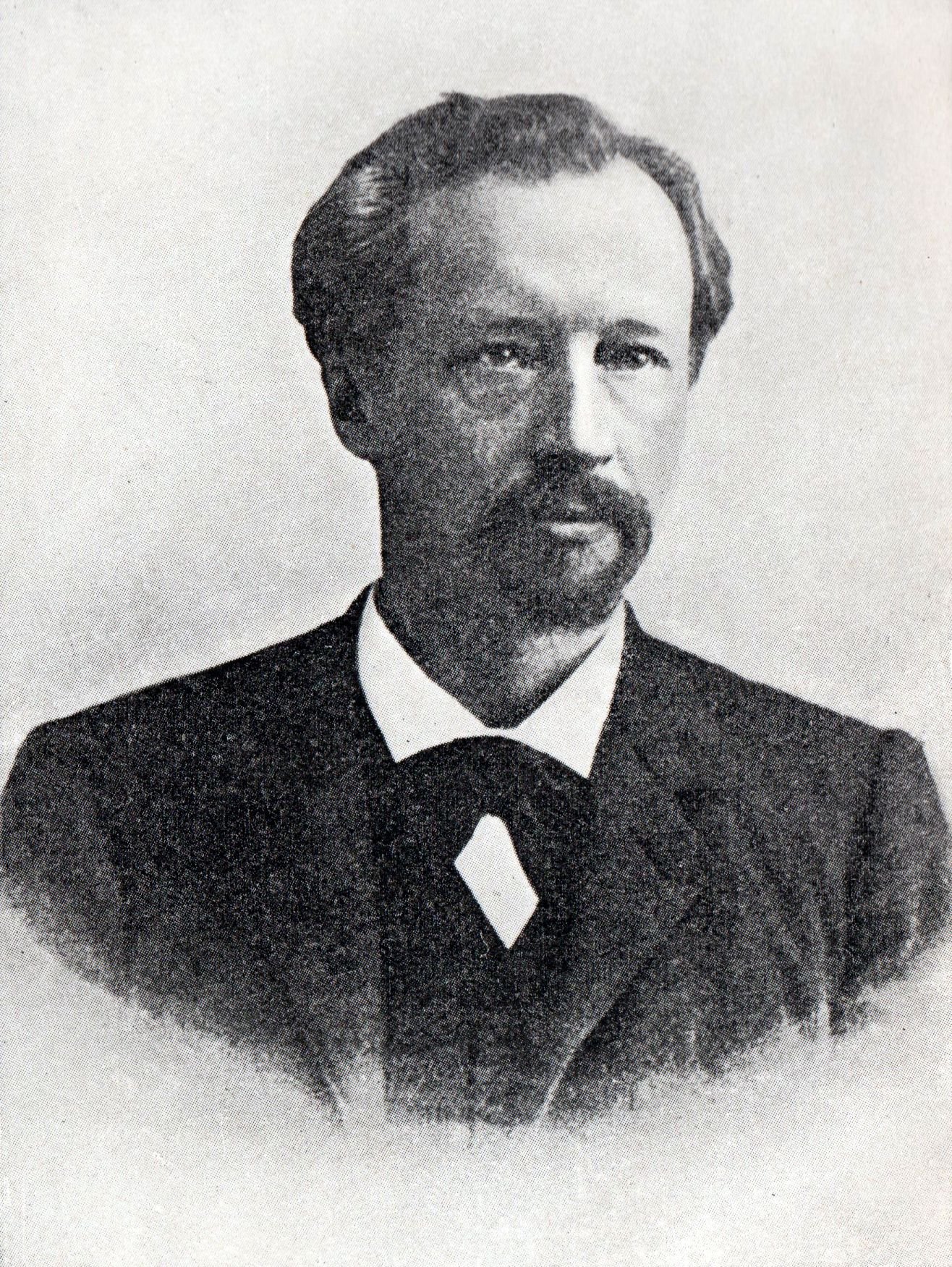
Hugo de Vries in the 1890s

To support his theory of pangenes, which was not widely noticed at the time, de Vries conducted a series of experiments hybridising varieties of multiple plant species in the 1890s. Unaware of Mendel's work, de Vries used the laws of dominance and recessiveness, segregation, and independent assortment to explain the 3:1 ratio of phenotypes in the second generation. His observations also confirmed his hypothesis that inheritance of specific traits in organisms comes in particles.

He further speculated that genes could cross the species barrier, with the same gene being responsible for hairiness in two different species of flower. Although generally true in a sense (orthologous genes, inherited from a common ancestor of both species, tend to stay responsible for similar phenotypes), de Vries meant a physical cross between species. This actually also happens, though very rarely in higher organisms (see horizontal gene transfer). De Vries' work on genetics inspired the research of Jantina Tammes, who worked with him for a period in 1898.

In the late 1890s, de Vries became aware of Mendel's obscure paper of thirty years earlier and he altered some of his terminology to match. When he published the results of his experiments in the French journal Comptes rendus de l'Académie des Sciences in 1900, he neglected to mention Mendel's work, but after criticism by Carl Correns he conceded Mendel's priority.

Correns and Erich von Tschermak now share credit for the rediscovery of Mendel's laws. Correns was a student of Nägeli, a renowned botanist with whom Mendel corresponded about his work with peas but who failed to understand its significance, while, coincidentally, Tschermak's grandfather taught Mendel botany during his student days in Vienna.

== Mutation theory ==
In his own time, de Vries was best known for his mutation theory. In 1886, he had discovered new forms among a group of Oenothera lamarckiana, a species of evening primrose, growing wild in an abandoned potato field near Hilversum, having escaped a nearby garden. Taking seeds from these, he found that they produced many new varieties in his experimental gardens; he introduced the term mutations for these suddenly appearing variations. In his two-volume publication The Mutation Theory (1900–1903) he postulated that evolution, especially the origin of species, might occur more frequently with such large-scale changes than via Darwinian gradualism, basically suggesting a form of saltationism. De Vries's theory was one of the chief contenders for the explanation of how evolution worked, leading, for example, Thomas Hunt Morgan to study mutations in the fruit fly, until the modern evolutionary synthesis became the dominant model in the 1930s. During the early decades of the twentieth century, de Vries' theory was enormously influential and continued to fascinate non-biologists long after the scientific community had abandoned much of it (while retaining the idea of mutations as a crucial source of natural variation). The large-scale primrose variations turned out to be the result of various chromosomal abnormalities, including ring chromosomes, balanced lethals and chromosome duplications (polyploidy), while the term mutation now generally is restricted to discrete changes in the DNA sequence. However, the popular understanding of "mutation" as a sudden leap to a new species has remained a staple theme of science fiction, e.g. the X-Men movies (and the comic books that preceded them).

In a published lecture of 1903 (Befruchtung und Bastardierung, Veit, Leipzig), de Vries was also the first to suggest the occurrence of recombinations between homologous chromosomes, now known as chromosomal crossovers, within a year after chromosomes were implicated in Mendelian inheritance by Walter Sutton.

Botanist Daniel Trembly MacDougal attended the lectures of de Vries on Mutation Theory, which de Vries delivered at the University of California in 1904. In 1905 he helped published these lectures into a book Species and Varieties: Their Origin by Mutation.

== Honors and retirement ==
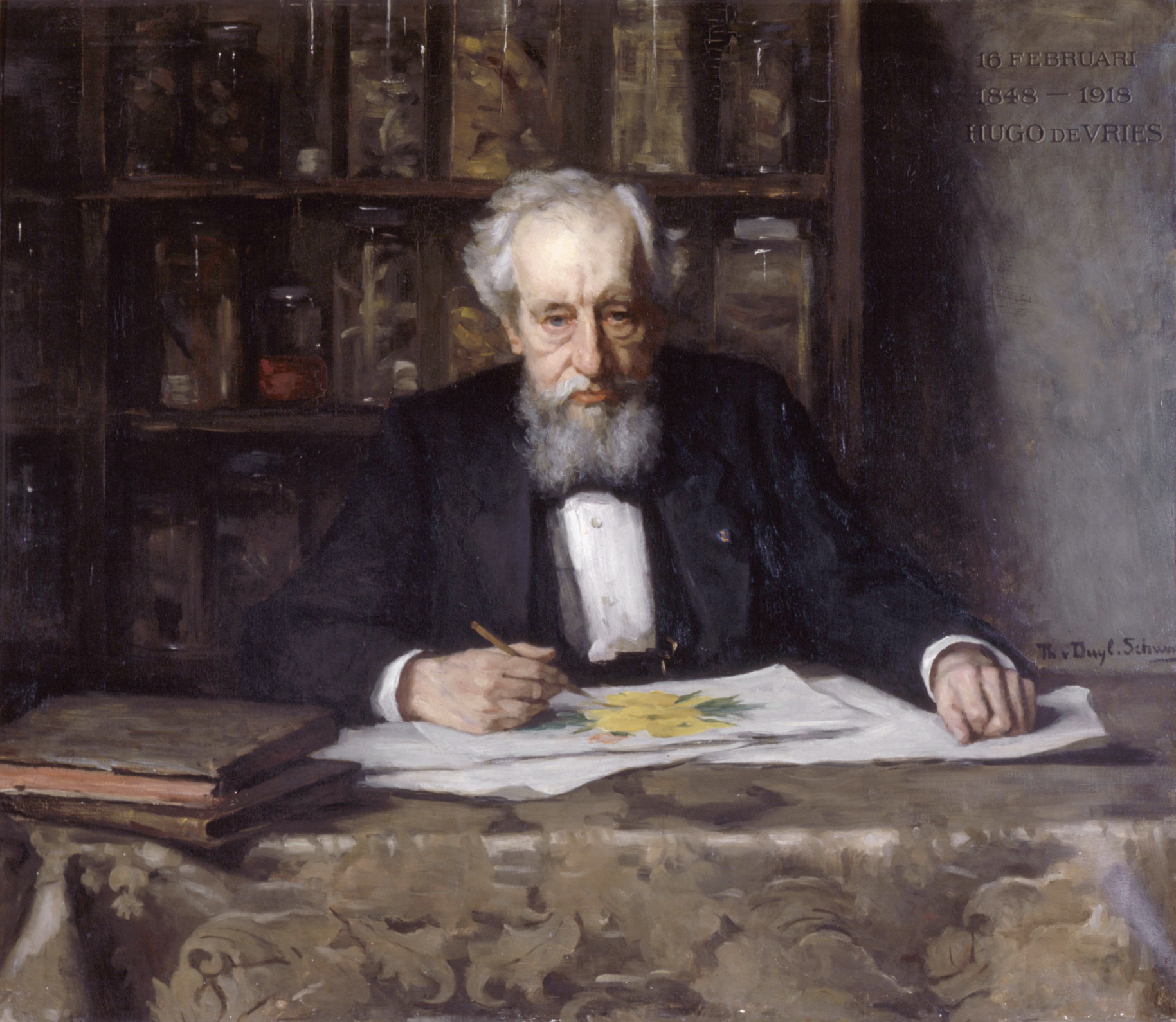
Hugo de Vries at his retirement (Thérèse Schwartze, 1918)

In 1878 de Vries became member of the Royal Netherlands Academy of Arts and Sciences. He was elected to the American Philosophical Society in 1903 and the United States National Academy of Sciences in 1904. In May 1905, de Vries was elected Foreign Member of the Royal Society. In 1910, he was elected a member of the Royal Swedish Academy of Sciences. In 1921, he was elected to the American Academy of Arts and Sciences. He was awarded the Darwin Medal in 1906 and the Linnean Medal in 1929.

He retired in 1918 from the University of Amsterdam and withdrew to his estate De Boeckhorst in Lunteren where he had large experimental gardens. He continued his studies with new forms until his death in 1935. The De Vries crater on the far side of the Moon was named after him in 1970.

== Books ==
His best known works are:

- Intracellular Pangenesis (1889)
- The Mutation Theory German edition Bd. 1-2 (1901–03), English edition Volume 2 (1909–10) Retrieved 2009-08-20
- Species and Varieties: Their Origin by Mutation (1905)
- Plant Breeding (1907), German translation (1908)
