= Wilhelm Johannsen =

Danish botanist and geneticist (1857–1927)

Wilhelm Ludvig Johannsen
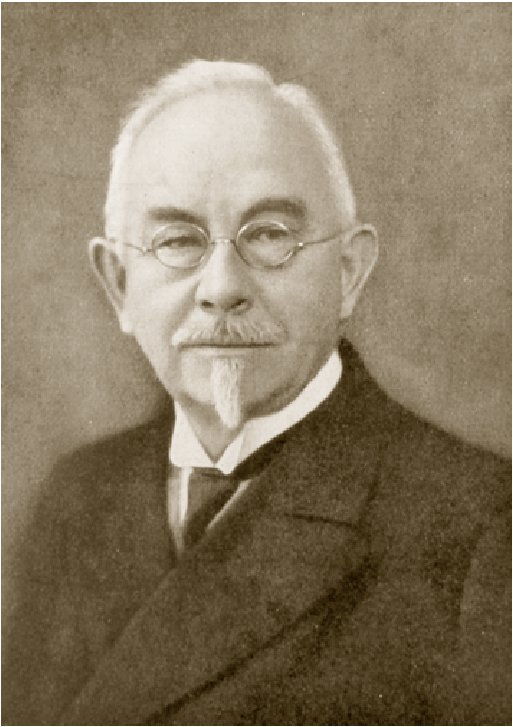
- Born: 3 February 1857; Elsinore, Denmark
- Died: 11 November 1927 (aged 70); Copenhagen, Denmark
- Education: University of Copenhagen
- Known for: proving the constancy of the genome Coining gene, genotype and phenotype
- Scientific career
- Fields: Genetics; Plant physiology
- Workplaces: University of Copenhagen

Wilhelm Johannsen (3 February 1857 – 11 November 1927) was a Danish pharmacist, botanist, plant physiologist, and geneticist. He is best known for coining the terms gene, phenotype and genotype, and for his 1903 "pure line" experiments in genetics.

== Biography ==
Johannsen was born in Copenhagen. While very young, he was apprenticed to a pharmacist and worked in Denmark and Germany beginning in 1872 until passing his pharmacist's exam in 1879. In 1881, he became assistant in the chemistry department at the Carlsberg Laboratory under the chemist Johan Kjeldahl. Johannsen studied the metabolism of dormancy and germination in seeds, tubers and buds. He showed that dormancy could be broken by various anesthetic compounds, such as diethyl ether and chloroform.

In 1892, he was appointed lecturer at Royal Veterinary and Agricultural University and later became professor of botany and plant physiology. He taught plant physiology. His best-known research concerned so-called pure lines of the self-fertile common bean. He was able to show that even in populations homozygous for all traits, i.e. without genetic variation, seed size followed a normal distribution. This was attributable to resource provision to the mother plant and to the position of seeds in pods and of pods on the plant.

Johannsen's findings led him to oppose contemporary Darwinists, most notably Francis Galton and Karl Pearson, who held the occurrence of normal distributed trait variation in populations as proof of gradual genetic variation on which selection could act. Only with the modern synthesis, was it established that variation needed to be heritable to act as the raw material for selection.

He coined the terms phenotype and genotype, first using them in his book in German as Elemente der exakten Erblichkeitslehre (Elements of the exact theory of heredity). This book was based in large part on Om arvelighed i samfund og i rene linier ("On heredity in society and in pure lines") and in his book Arvelighedslærens Elementer. It was in this book Johannsen also introduced the term gene. This term was coined in opposition to the then common pangene that stemmed from Darwin's theory of pangenesis. The book became one of the founding texts of genetics.

Also in 1905, Johannsen was appointed professor of plant physiology at the University of Copenhagen, becoming vice-chancellor in 1917. In December 1910, Johannsen was invited to give an address before the American Society of Naturalists. This talk was printed in the American Naturalist. In 1911, he was invited to give a series of four lectures at Columbia University.

Johannsen was a corresponding member of the Academy of Natural Sciences of Philadelphia (elected 1915). He was elected to the American Philosophical Society in 1916.

== Sources ==
- Anker, Jean (1932) Wilhelm Johannsen, pp. 177–180 in: Meisen, V. Prominent Danish Scientists through the Ages. University Library of Copenhagen 450th Anniversary. Levin & Munksgaard, Copenhagen.
- Roll-Hansen, Nils (1983) The Death of Spontaneous Generation and the Birth of the Gene: Two Case Studies of Relativism. Social Studies of Science 13 (4): 481–519. JSTOR 284846
- Kim, Kyung-Man (1991) On the Reception of Johannsen's Pure Line Theory: Toward a Sociology of Scientific Validity. Social Studies of Science 21 (4): 649–679. JSTOR 285343
