= BBC Darwin Season =

The BBC Darwin Season is a series of television and radio programmes commissioned by the BBC in 2009 to celebrate the bicentenary of the great naturalist Charles Darwin (1809-1882) and the 150th anniversary of the publication of his revolutionary book, On the Origin of Species in November, 1859. In partnership with the Open University, the BBC produced a special documentary, Charles Darwin and the Tree of Life, narrated by David Attenborough, and three major series. Other presenters involved are Andrew Marr, Melvyn Bragg and Jimmy Doherty. The overall commissioning editor for the season is Martin Davidson, the BBC's commissioning editor for specialist factual (in-house). Contributing units of the BBC are BBC Science, the Natural History Unit, the Religion and Ethics department and the children's channel, CBBC.

== Highlights ==
=== Radio ===
Events in the Darwin season are broadcast on the broadcaster's flagship voice programming channel, Radio 4 and its arts and culture channel, Radio 3.

Radio 4

- Melvyn Bragg presents Darwin: In Our Time, a four-part documentary series examining "Darwin's writing remains such a profound influence on our understanding of the natural world."
- In Dear Darwin, five eminent contemporary thinkers present spoken letters to Charles Darwin "expressing their thoughts on his legacy.
  - Craig Venter, founder of The Institute for Genomic Research
  - Jonathan Miller, theatre director, author and broadcaster
  - Jerry Coyne, University of Chicago professor of biology, writer
  - Peter Bentley, researcher in evolutionary computation and biologically inspired computing
  - Baruch Blumberg, recipient of the 1976 Nobel Prize in Medicine. Blumberg identified the Hepatitis B virus, and later developed the diagnostic test and vaccine for it.
- Maritime historian Robert Prescott seeks the final resting place of Darwin's ship in Hunting The Beagle
- Poet and journalist Ruth Padel, a descendant of Charles Darwin, "[explores] the ideas and emotions which shaped Darwin" in a four-part series, Darwin: My Ancestor

Radio 3

- In The Origins Of The Origin, Andrew Cunningham explores the intellectual context in which Darwin presented his work, particularly the precursors who presented earlier evolutionary theories.
- Rev Angela Tilby discusses Darwin's religious views in Darwin's Conundrum
- The Essay: Darwin's Children is a series of essays in which representatives of five professions examine the impact of evolutionary theory on their field.
  - Jonathan Gottschall, literary darwinist: literary interpretation
  - Judith Donath of MIT Media Lab: online social networks such as Facebook
  - Douglas Davies, theologian, anthropologist: anthropology
  - Diana Donald, art historian: art and aesthetic theory
  - James K Galbraith: economics

Darwin is also the subject of special editions of the programmes Night Waves and Words and Music.

=== Television ===
- On BBC One:
  - "Charles Darwin and the Tree of Life", an introduction to Darwin's life and his theory of evolution, presented by David Attenborough.
  - Life, a ten-part nature documentary series produced by the BBC Natural History Unit and narrated by Attenborough.
- On BBC Two:
  - Darwin's Dangerous Idea a three-part series presented by Andrew Marr showing how the theory of evolution has influenced politics and society in the last 150 years.
  - Jimmy Doherty in Darwin's Garden, a three-part series based in which the presenter recreates some of Darwin's experiments at Down House.
  - Did Darwin Kill God?, in which philosopher and theologian Conor Cunningham of Nottingham University discusses the history of Christian attitudes to Biblical literalism, arguing that it is legitimate to accept Darwin's theory of evolution and believe in God.
- On BBC Four:
  - What Darwin Didn't Know, a 90-minute examination of what we have learned since Darwin, presented by Armand Leroi.
  - Darwin's Struggle: The Evolution Of The Origin Of Species, a 60-minute documentary featuring biographers and scientists examining, through Darwin's own private writings, the internal struggle which Darwin went through during the twenty years he took to develop his ideas into a revolutionary book.
