= Armand Marie Leroi =

New Zealand-born Dutch author, broadcaster, and professor

Armand Leroi
- Born: 16 July 1964 (age 62); Wellington, New Zealand
- Education: Dalhousie University (undergraduate); University of California, Irvine postgraduate)
- Scientific career
- Fields: Evolutionary biology
- Workplaces: Imperial College London; Albert Einstein College of Medicine; University of California, Irvine; Dalhousie University
- Thesis: The origin and evolution of life history trade-offs (1993)
- Doctoral advisor: Michael R. Rose
- Website: www3.imperial.ac.uk/people/a.leroi

Armand Marie Leroi (born 16 July 1964) is a New Zealand-born Dutch author, broadcaster, and professor of evolutionary developmental biology at Imperial College in London. He received the Guardian First Book Award in 2004 for his book Mutants: On Genetic Variety and the Human Body. He has presented scientific documentaries on Channel 4 such as Extraterrestrial (2005) and What Makes Us Human (2006), and BBC Four such as What Darwin Didn't Know (2009), Aristotle's Lagoon (2010), and Secret Science of Pop (2012).

== Early life and education ==
A Dutch citizen, Leroi was born in Wellington, New Zealand. His youth was spent in New Zealand, South Africa and Canada. He was awarded a Bachelor of Science degree by Dalhousie University, Halifax, Canada in 1989, and a Ph.D. by the University of California, Irvine in 1993. This was followed by postdoctoral work at the Albert Einstein College of Medicine, New York City using the nematode Caenorhabditis elegans as an experimental organism.

== Career ==
In 2001, Leroi was appointed lecturer at Imperial College, London. He has written several books, including Mutants: On Genetic Variety and the Human Body. In 2004 he adapted his book into a television documentary series for Britain's Channel 4 entitled Human Mutants.

Leroi has presented two other TV documentary series for Channel 4: Alien Worlds (titled Extraterrestrial outside the UK) in 2005, and What Makes Us Human in 2006. Despite his TV appearances, Leroi has expressed scepticism about the truthfulness of television creatives. In an email exchange with TV director Martin Durkin, concerning the latter's documentary The Great Global Warming Swindle, Leroi wrote: "left to their own devices, TV producers simply cannot be trusted to tell the truth".

He is also known as one of the first testers of the beneficial acclimation hypothesis. In 2005, Leroi published an article in The New York Times entitled "A Family Tree in Every Gene", which argued for the usefulness of racial types in medical genetics.

In January 2009 Leroi presented the BBC4 documentary What Darwin Didn't Know, which charts the progress in the field of Evolutionary Theory since the original publication of On the Origin of Species in 1859.

In January 2010 Leroi presented the BBC4 documentary Aristotle's Lagoon, filmed on the Greek island of Lesbos and suggesting that Aristotle was the world's first biologist. The documentary account was expanded in his 2014 book The Lagoon: How Aristotle Invented Science. He accepted Aristotle as his "scientific hero", describing: "His genius was simply to invent biology."

Leroi collaborated on the DarwinTunes evolutionary music project, using natural selection to create music. The research findings explained how music choice evolved in the pattern of Charles Darwin's natural selection. The study was published in the Proceedings of the National Academy of Sciences in 2012. Leroi's research team also analysed the musical properties of the US Billboard Hot 100 between 1960 and 2010, and found that popular music emerged in three stylistic revolutions around 1964, 1983 and 1991. The study was published in the Royal Society Open Science in 2015. Explaining the contributions of The Beatles to the evolution of music, he said, "They're not making that [1964] revolution, they're joining it. In 2016, he presented The Secret Science of Pop on BBC4.

== Awards and honours ==
Leroi received the EMBO Award for Communication in the Life Sciences of the European Molecular Biology Laboratory in 2006. In 2004, he won the Guardian First Book Award for Mutants: On Genetic Variety and the Human Body. He was awarded the 2014 JBS Haldane Lecture of The Genetics Society. The same year he received the London Hellenic Prize of the Hellenic Centre for The Lagoon: How Aristotle Invented Science.

== Books ==
- Mutants: On Genetic Variety and the Human Body (Viking/Penguin, 2004) ISBN 978-0142004821
- The Lagoon: How Aristotle Invented Science (Viking, 9/25/2014) ISBN 978-0670026746
