= Charles Darwin and the Tree of Life =

2009 British TV documentary

- Programme title card from UK broadcast
- Genre: Nature documentary
- Presented by: David Attenborough
- Composer: Dan Jones
- Country of origin: United Kingdom
- Original language: English
- No. of episodes: 1

Production
- Executive producer: Brian Leith
- Producer: Sacha Mirzoeff
- Running time: 60 minutes
- Production companies: BBC Natural History Unit; Open University

Original release
- Network: BBC One
- Release: 1 February 2009

Related
- BBC Darwin Season

Charles Darwin and the Tree of Life is a 2009 television documentary about Charles Darwin and his revolutionary theory of evolution through natural selection, produced by the BBC to mark the bicentenary of Darwin's birth. It is part of the BBC Darwin Season. The presenter, David Attenborough, outlines the development of the theory by Darwin through his observations of animals and plants in nature and in the domesticated state, visiting sites important in Darwin's own life, including Down House, Cambridge University and the Natural History Museum, and using archive footage from Attenborough's many nature documentaries for the BBC. He reviews the development of the theory since its beginnings, and its revolutionary impact on the way in which humans view themselves – not as having dominion over the animals as The Bible says, but as part of the natural world and subject to the same controlling forces that govern all life on Earth.

== Reception ==
The programme was aired in a primetime slot on BBC One, at 9pm on Sunday 1 February. Official ratings from BARB show that it attracted an audience of 6.34 million viewers, a healthy figure for a factual programme. Overnight data suggested 23% of the available audience was watching.

The programme drew effusive praise from critics:

- In The Guardian, Sam Wollaston describes how Attenborough tells the story of natural selection "through the life and work of his hero, and also through his own life and work, which has always had Darwinism at its core. The two strands have been artfully twisted together, into a beautiful double helix of television that makes perfect sense. Except to the creationist loons."
- In The Times, Andrew Billen praises Attenborough's "grace and fluency," in demonstrating "that what always comes to Darwin's rescue is scientific evidence," and David Chater remarks on how, through the use of archive clips, "the viewer also sees Attenborough himself evolve from a young presenter to a latter-day sage."
- In The Independent, Tom Sutcliffe also praises the presenter: "Not everyone is up to the humility evolutionary theory demands of us, but David Attenborough is, and he made the case well."
- In Ireland, Pat Stacey of the Evening Herald describes it as "a stunning piece of television – epic television – that brilliantly pulled together with pin-sharp clarity the different strands of Darwin's awesome, irrefutable discoveries, as though Attenborough were constructing a model of the double helix. It was beautifully made and utterly thrilling."

== Associated material and DVD ==
- The region 2 DVD has been released by 2 Entertain on 2 March 2009 (BBCDVD2938) containing the full 60-minute documentary.
- The Open University has produced supporting material on its website. The Wellcome Trust made the animated "Tree of Life" from the documentary available online.

== Awards ==
The Grierson Awards 2009, Winner, Best Science Documentary
