= Rationes seminales =

Rationes seminales (Latin, from the Greek λόγοι σπερματικοὶ or logoi spermatikoi), translated variously as "germinal principles", "causal principles", "primordial reasons", "original factors", "seminal reasons", "seminal virtues", or "seedlike principles", express a theological theory on the origin of species. This involves the doctrine of a divine creation of the world in seed form, with certain potentialities, which can then develop or unfold accordingly over time; what appears as change is simply the realization of the preexisting potentialities.

The theory is a metaphor of the growth of a plant: much as a planted seed eventually develops into a tree, so a creator-god formed the world by planting rationes seminales, from which all subsequent life sprung. The concept functions to reconcile the belief that God created all things with the evident fact that new things are constantly developing.

== History ==
The roots and terminology of this idea occur within the Hellenistic philosophy of the Stoics (4th century BCE onwards) and in Neoplatonism.

The idea passed into Christian thought through the writings of authors such as Justin Martyr (2nd century CE), Athenagoras of Athens (c. 133 – c. 190 CE), Tertullian, Gregory of Nyssa, Augustine of Hippo (354-430), Bonaventure (1221-1274), Albertus Magnus (c. 1200 - 1280), and Roger Bacon (13th century). Contemporary theistic evolutionists look to this doctrine for inspiration on the consistency of Judeo-Christian creation with the modern biological theory of evolution.

== See also ==
- History of evolutionary thought
