= DarwinTunes =

Research project into natural selection in music creation

DarwinTunes was a research project into the use of natural selection to create music led by Bob MacCallum and Armand Leroi, scientists at Imperial College London. The project asks volunteers on the Internet to listen to automatically generated sound loops and rate them based on aesthetic preference. After the volunteers rate the loops on a five-point scale, software permits the highest rated loops to 'reproduce sexually' and populate the next generation of musical loops.

In a paper published in the Proceedings of the National Academy of Sciences, the DarwinTunes developers describe how their first experimental population derived from two randomly generated founding loops, allowed 100 generations of loops to evolve without any selection pressure before asking members of the public to rate the loops. The paper found that for the first 500 to 600 generations, aesthetic quality of the loops dramatically improved before reaching a stable equilibrium. They tested this using ratings by listeners and also by using sampling techniques used by music information retrieval technology—namely the Chordino and Rhythm Patterns algorithms, which measure the presence of chords used in Western music and the presence of rhythm respectively.

== See also ==
- Evolutionary music
