= History of evolutionary thought =

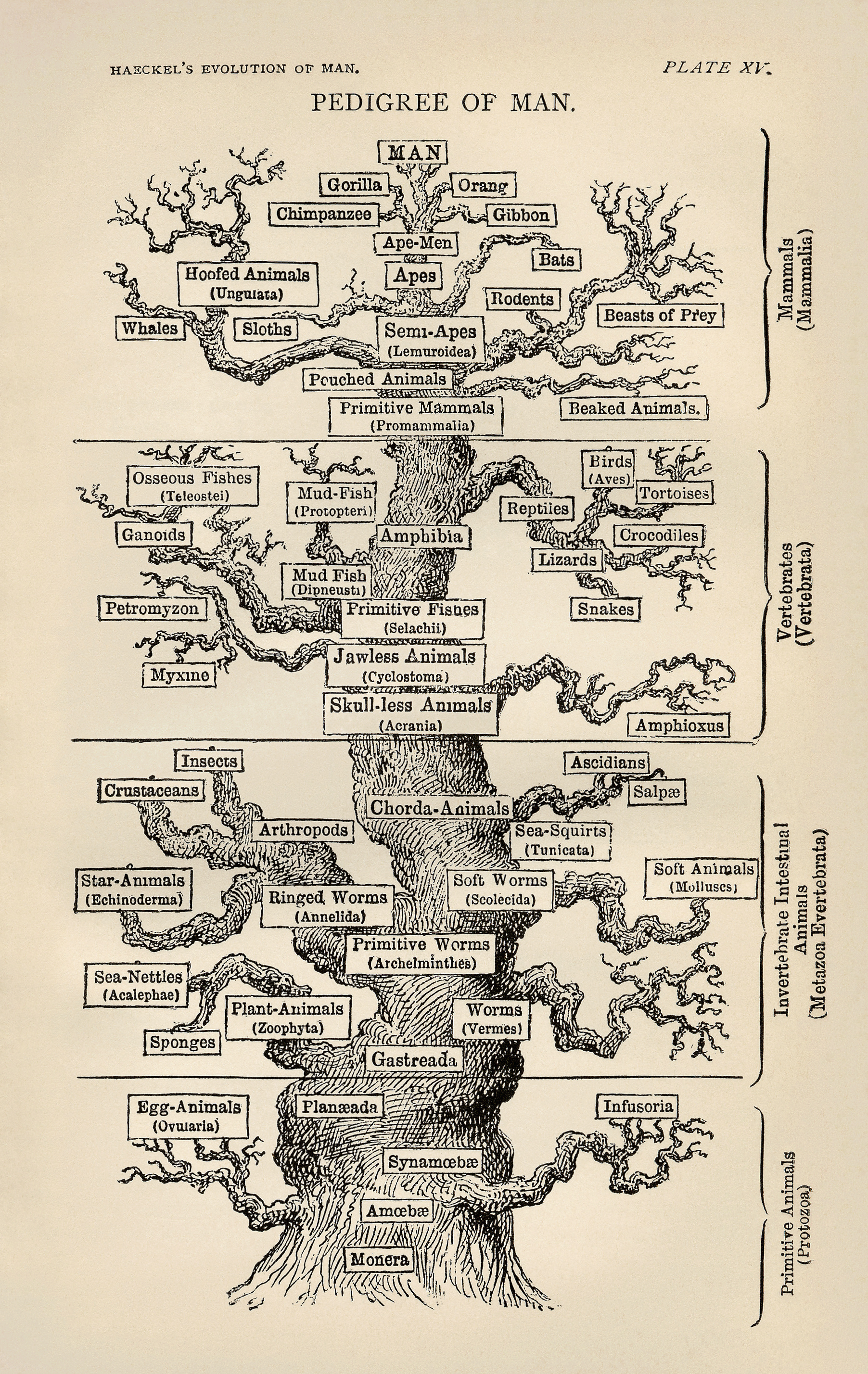
The tree of life as depicted by Ernst Haeckel in The Evolution of Man (1879) illustrates the 19th-century view of evolution as a progressive process leading towards man.

Evolutionary thought, the recognition that species change over time and the perceived understanding of how such processes work, has roots in antiquity. With the beginnings of modern biological taxonomy in the late 17th century, two opposed ideas influenced Western biological thinking: essentialism, the belief that every species has essential characteristics that are unalterable, a concept which had developed from medieval Aristotelian metaphysics, and that fit well with natural theology; and the development of the new anti-Aristotelian approach to science. Naturalists began to focus on the variability of species; the emergence of palaeontology with the concept of extinction further undermined static views of nature. In the early 19th century prior to Darwinism, Jean-Baptiste Lamarck proposed his theory of the transmutation of species, the first fully formed theory of evolution.

In 1858 Charles Darwin and Alfred Russel Wallace published a new evolutionary theory, explained in detail in Darwin's On the Origin of Species (1859). Darwin's theory, originally called descent with modification, is known contemporarily as Darwinism or Darwinian theory. Unlike Lamarck, Darwin proposed common descent and a branching tree of life, meaning that two very different species could share a common ancestor. Darwin based his theory on the idea of natural selection: it synthesized a broad range of evidence from animal husbandry, biogeography, geology, morphology, and embryology. Debate over Darwin's work led to the rapid acceptance of the general concept of evolution, but the specific mechanism he proposed, natural selection, was not widely accepted until it was revived by developments in biology that occurred during the 1920s through the 1940s. Before that time most biologists regarded other factors as responsible for evolution. Alternatives to natural selection suggested during "the eclipse of Darwinism" (c. 1880 to 1920) included inheritance of acquired characteristics (neo-Lamarckism), an innate drive for change (orthogenesis), and sudden large mutations (saltationism). Mendelian genetics, a series of 19th-century experiments with pea plant variations rediscovered in 1900, was integrated with natural selection by Ronald Fisher, J. B. S. Haldane, and Sewall Wright during the 1910s to 1930s, and resulted in the founding of the new discipline of population genetics. During the 1930s and 1940s population genetics became integrated with other biological fields, resulting in a widely applicable theory of evolution that encompassed much of biology—the modern synthesis.

Following the establishment of evolutionary biology, studies of mutation and genetic diversity in natural populations, combined with biogeography and systematics, led to sophisticated mathematical and causal models of evolution. Palaeontology and comparative anatomy allowed more detailed reconstructions of the evolutionary history of life. After the rise of molecular genetics in the 1950s, the field of molecular evolution developed, based on protein sequences and immunological tests, and later incorporating RNA and DNA studies. The gene-centred view of evolution rose to prominence in the 1960s, followed by the neutral theory of molecular evolution, sparking debates over adaptationism, the unit of selection, and the relative importance of genetic drift versus natural selection as causes of evolution. In the late 20th-century, DNA sequencing led to molecular phylogenetics and the reorganization of the tree of life into the three-domain system by Carl Woese. In addition, the newly recognized factors of symbiogenesis and horizontal gene transfer introduced yet more complexity into evolutionary theory. Discoveries in evolutionary biology have made a significant impact not just within the traditional branches of biology, but also in other academic disciplines (for example: anthropology and psychology) and on society at large.

== Antiquity ==
=== Indigenous cultures ===
Several cultures across the world seem to have a rudimentary understanding of the theory of evolution, seeing humans as descending from certain mammals. These include the Malagasy people, who see humans as descending from indri; the Aboriginal Tasmanians, which see humans as descending from kangaroos; and some Native American cultures, such as the Navajo, whose creation myth details humans changing from animalistic creatures.

=== Greeks ===
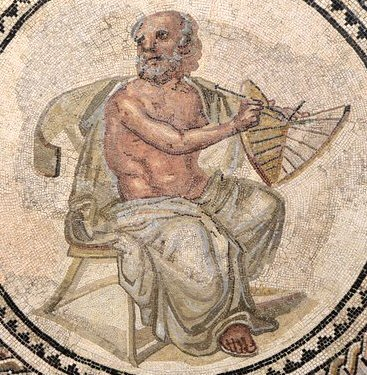
The Greek philosopher Anaximander of Miletus argued that humans originated from fish.

Proposals that one type of animal, even humans, could descend from other types of animals, are known to go back to the pre-Socratic Greek philosophers. Anaximander of Miletus proposed that the first animals lived in water, during a wet phase of the Earth's past, and that the first land-dwelling ancestors of mankind must have been born in water, and only spent part of their life on land. He also argued that the first human of the form known today must have been the child of a different type of animal (probably a fish), because man needs prolonged nursing to live. In the late nineteenth century, Anaximander was hailed as the "first Darwinist", but this characterization is no longer commonly agreed. Anaximander's hypothesis could be considered "evolution" in a sense, although not a Darwinian one.

Empedocles argued that what we call birth and death in animals are just the mingling and separations of elements which cause the countless "tribes of mortal things". Specifically, the first animals and plants were like disjointed parts of the ones we see today, some of which survived by joining in different combinations, and then intermixing during the development of the embryo, (Note: Not in phylogeny: Empedocles did not have any conception of evolution through geological time.) and where "everything turned out as it would have if it were on purpose, there the creatures survived, being accidentally compounded in a suitable way." Other philosophers who became more influential at that time, including Plato, Aristotle, and members of the Stoic school of philosophy, believed that the types of all things, not only living things, were fixed by divine design.

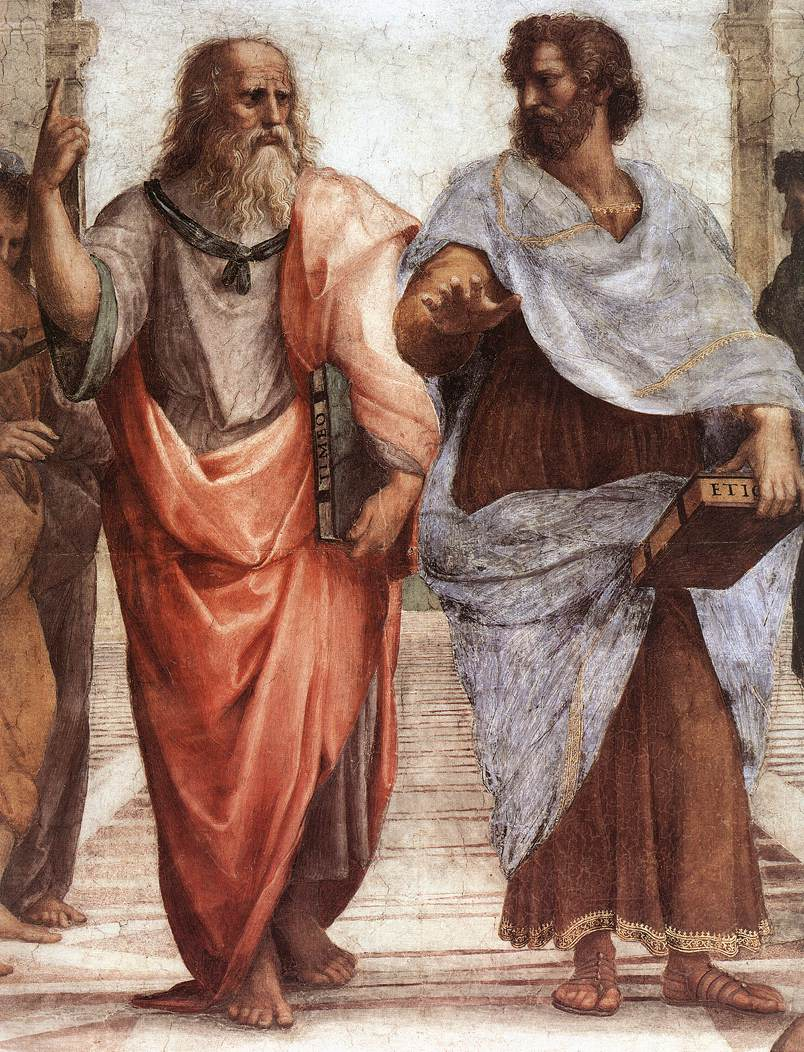
Plato (left) and Aristotle (right), a detail from The School of Athens (1509 – 1511) by Raphael

Plato was called by biologist Ernst Mayr "the great antihero of evolutionism," because he promoted belief in essentialism, which is also referred to as the theory of Forms. This theory holds that each natural type of object in the observed world is an imperfect manifestation of the ideal, form or "species" which defines that type. In his Timaeus for example, Plato has a character tell a story that the Demiurge created the cosmos and everything in it because, being good, and hence, "free from jealousy, He desired that all things should be as like Himself as they could be." The creator created all conceivable forms of life, since "without them the universe will be incomplete, for it will not contain every kind of animal which it ought to contain, if it is to be perfect." This "principle of plenitude"—the idea that all potential forms of life are essential to a perfect creation—greatly influenced Christian thought. However, some historians of science have questioned how much influence Plato's essentialism had on natural philosophy by stating that many philosophers after Plato believed that species might be capable of transformation and that the idea that biologic species were fixed and possessed unchangeable essential characteristics did not become important until the beginning of biological taxonomy in the 17th and 18th centuries.

Aristotle, the most influential of the Greek philosophers in Europe, was a student of Plato and is also the earliest natural historian whose work has been preserved in any real detail. His writings on biology resulted from his research into natural history on and around the island of Lesbos, and have survived in the form of four books, usually known by their Latin names, De anima (On the Soul), Historia animalium (History of Animals), De generatione animalium (Generation of Animals), and De partibus animalium (On the Parts of Animals). Aristotle's works contain accurate observations, fitted into his own theories of the body's mechanisms. However, for Charles Singer, "Nothing is more remarkable than [Aristotle's] efforts to [exhibit] the relationships of living things as a scala naturae." This scala naturae, described in Historia animalium, classified organisms in relation to a hierarchical but static "Ladder of Life" or "great chain of being," placing them according to their complexity of structure and function, with organisms that showed greater vitality and ability to move described as "higher organisms." Aristotle believed that features of living organisms showed clearly that they had what he called a final cause, that is to say that their form suited their function. He explicitly rejected the view of Empedocles that living creatures might have originated by chance.

Other Greek philosophers, such as Zeno of Citium the founder of the Stoic school of philosophy, agreed with Aristotle and other earlier philosophers that nature showed clear evidence of being designed for a purpose; this view is known as teleology. The Roman Skeptic philosopher Cicero wrote that Zeno was known to have held the view, central to Stoic physics, that nature is primarily "directed and concentrated...to secure for the world...the structure best fitted for survival."

=== Chinese ===
Ancient Chinese thinkers such as Zhuang Zhou (c. 369 – c. 286 BC), a Taoist philosopher, expressed ideas on changing biological species. According to Joseph Needham, Taoism explicitly denies the fixity of biological species and Taoist philosophers speculated that species had developed differing attributes in response to differing environments. Taoism regards humans, nature and the heavens as existing in a state of "constant transformation" known as the Tao, in contrast with the more static view of nature typical of Western thought.

=== Roman Empire ===
Lucretius' poem De rerum natura provides the best surviving explanation of the ideas of the Greek Epicurean philosophers. It describes the development of the cosmos, the Earth, living things, and human society through purely naturalistic mechanisms, without any reference to supernatural involvement. De rerum natura would influence the cosmological and evolutionary speculations of philosophers and scientists during and after the Renaissance. This view was in strong contrast with the views of Roman philosophers of the Stoic school such as Seneca the Younger and Pliny the Elder who had a strongly teleological view of the natural world that influenced Christian theology. Cicero reports that the peripatetic and Stoic view of nature as an agency concerned most basically with producing life "best fitted for survival" was taken for granted among the Hellenistic elite.

=== Early Church Fathers ===
==== Origen of Alexandria ====
In line with earlier Greek thought, the third-century Christian philosopher and Church Father Origen of Alexandria argued that the creation story in the Book of Genesis should be interpreted as an allegory for the falling of human souls away from the glory of the divine, and not as a literal, historical account:

For who that has understanding will suppose that the first, and second, and third day, and the evening and the morning, existed without a sun, and moon, and stars? And that the first day was, as it were, also without a sky? And who is so foolish as to suppose that God, after the manner of a husbandman, planted a paradise in Eden, towards the east, and placed in it a tree of life, visible and palpable, so that one tasting of the fruit by the bodily teeth obtained life? And again, that one was a partaker of good and evil by masticating what was taken from the tree? And if God is said to walk in the paradise in the evening, and Adam to hide himself under a tree, I do not suppose that anyone doubts that these things figuratively indicate certain mysteries, the history having taken place in appearance, and not literally.

— Origen, On the First Principles IV.16

==== Gregory of Nyssa ====
Gregory of Nyssa wrote:

Scripture informs us that the Deity proceeded by a sort of graduated and ordered advance to the creation of man. After the foundations of the universe were laid, as the history records, man did not appear on the earth at once, but the creation of the brutes preceded him, and the plants preceded them. Thereby Scripture shows that the vital forces blended with the world of matter according to a gradation; first it infused itself into insensate nature; and in continuation of this advanced into the sentient world; and then ascended to intelligent and rational beings (emphasis added).

Henry Fairfield Osborn wrote in his work on the history of evolutionary thought, From the Greeks to Darwin (1894):

Among the Christian Fathers the movement towards a partly naturalistic interpretation of the order of Creation was made by Gregory of Nyssa in the fourth century, and was completed by Augustine in the fourth and fifth centuries. ...[Gregory of Nyssa] taught that Creation was potential. God imparted to matter its fundamental properties and laws. The objects and completed forms of the Universe developed gradually out of chaotic material.

==== Augustine of Hippo ====
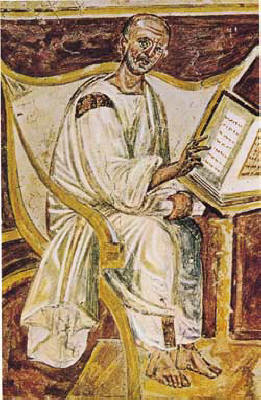
Augustine of Hippo, shown in this sixth-century AD Roman fresco, wrote that some creatures may have developed from the "decomposition" of previously existing organisms.

In the fourth century AD, the bishop and theologian Augustine of Hippo followed Origen in arguing that Christians should read the Genesis creation story allegorically. In his book De Genesi ad litteram (On the Literal Meaning of Genesis), he prefaces his account with the following:

In all sacred books, we should consider the eternal truths that are taught, the facts that are narrated, the future events that are predicted, and the precepts or counsels that are given. In the case of a narrative of events, the question arises whether everything must be taken according to the figurative sense only, or whether it must be expounded and defended also as a faithful record of what happened. No Christian would dare say that the narrative must not be taken in a figurative sense. For St. Paul says: Now all these things that happened to them were symbolic [1 Cor 10:11]. And he explains the statement in Genesis, And they shall be two in one flesh [Eph 5:32], as a great mystery in reference to Christ and to the Church.

Later he differentiates between the days of the Genesis 1 creation narrative and 24 hour days that humans experience (arguing that "we know [the days of creation] are different from the ordinary day of which we are familiar") before describing what could be called an early form of theistic evolution:

The things [God] had potentially created... [came] forth in the course of time on different days according to their different kinds... [and] the rest of the earth [was] filled with its various kinds of creatures, [which] produced their appropriate forms in due time.

Augustine deployed the concept of rationes seminales to blend the idea of divine creation with subsequent development. This idea "that forms of life had been transformed 'slowly over time'" prompted Father Giuseppe Tanzella-Nitti, Professor of Theology at the Pontifical Santa Croce University in Rome, to claim that Augustine had suggested a form of evolution.

Henry Fairfield Osborn wrote in From the Greeks to Darwin (1894):

If the orthodoxy of Augustine had remained the teaching of the Church, the final establishment of Evolution would have come far earlier than it did, certainly during the eighteenth instead of the nineteenth century, and the bitter controversy over this truth of Nature would never have arisen. ... Plainly as the direct or instantaneous Creation of animals and plants appeared to be taught in Genesis, Augustine read this in the light of primary causation and the gradual development from the imperfect to the perfect of Aristotle. This most influential teacher thus handed down to his followers opinions which closely conform to the progressive views of those theologians of the present day who have accepted the Evolution theory.

In A History of the Warfare of Science with Theology in Christendom (1896), Andrew Dickson White wrote about Augustine's attempts to preserve the ancient evolutionary approach to the creation as follows:

For ages a widely accepted doctrine had been that water, filth, and carrion had received power from the Creator to generate worms, insects, and a multitude of the smaller animals; and this doctrine had been especially welcomed by St. Augustine and many of the fathers, since it relieved the Almighty of making, Adam of naming, and Noah of living in the ark with these innumerable despised species.

In Augustine's De Genesi contra Manichæos, on Genesis he says: "To suppose that God formed man from the dust with bodily hands is very childish. ... God neither formed man with bodily hands nor did he breathe upon him with throat and lips." Augustine suggests in other work his theory of the later development of insects out of carrion, and the adoption of the old emanation or evolution theory, showing that "certain very small animals may not have been created on the fifth and sixth days, but may have originated later from putrefying matter." Concerning Augustine's De Trinitate (On the Trinity), White wrote that Augustine "develops at length the view that in the creation of living beings there was something like a growth—that God is the ultimate author, but works through secondary causes; and finally argues that certain substances are endowed by God with the power of producing certain classes of plants and animals."

Augustine implies that whatever science shows, the Bible must teach:

Usually, even a non-Christian knows something about the earth, the heavens, and the other elements of this world, about the motion and orbit of the stars ... Now, it is a disgraceful and dangerous thing for an infidel to hear a Christian, presumably giving the meaning of Holy Scripture, talking non-sense on these topics; and we should take all means to prevent such an embarrassing situation, in which people show up vast ignorance in a Christian and laugh it to scorn. The shame is not so much that an ignorant individual is derided, but that people outside the household of the faith think our sacred writers held such opinions, and, to the great loss of those for whose salvation we toil, the writers of our Scripture are criticized and rejected as unlearned men.

== Middle Ages ==
=== Islamic philosophy and the struggle for existence ===
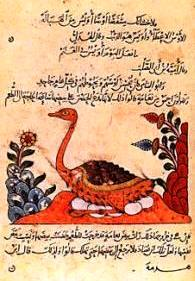
A page from the Kitāb al-Hayawān (Book of Animals) by al-Jāḥiẓ

Although Greek and Roman evolutionary ideas died out in Western Europe after the fall of the Roman Empire, they were not lost to Islamic philosophers and scientists (nor to the culturally Greek Byzantine Empire). In the Islamic Golden Age of the 8th to the 13th centuries, philosophers explored ideas about natural history. These ideas included transmutation from non-living to living: "from mineral to plant, from plant to animal, and from animal to man."

In the medieval Islamic world, the scholar al-Jāḥiẓ wrote his Book of Animals in the 9th century. Conway Zirkle, writing about the history of natural selection in 1941, said that an excerpt from this work was the only relevant passage he had found from an Arabian scholar. He provided a quotation describing the struggle for existence, citing a Spanish translation of this work: "Every weak animal devours those weaker than itself. Strong animals cannot escape being devoured by other animals stronger than they. And in this respect, men do not differ from animals, some with respect to others, although they do not arrive at the same extremes. In short, God has disposed some human beings as a cause of life for others, and likewise, he has disposed the latter as a cause of the death of the former." Al-Jāḥiẓ also wrote descriptions of food chains.

Some of Ibn Khaldūn's thoughts, according to some commentators, anticipate the biological theory of evolution. In 1377, Ibn Khaldūn wrote the Muqaddimah in which he asserted that humans developed from "the world of the monkeys," in a process by which "species become more numerous". In chapter 1 he writes: "This world with all the created things in it has a certain order and solid construction. It shows nexuses between causes and things caused, combinations of some parts of creation with others, and transformations of some existent things into others, in a pattern that is both remarkable and endless."

The Muqaddimah also states in chapter 6:

We explained there that the whole of existence in (all) its simple and composite worlds is arranged in a natural order of ascent and descent, so that everything constitutes an uninterrupted continuum. The essences at the end of each particular stage of the worlds are by nature prepared to be transformed into the essence adjacent to them, either above or below them. This is the case with the simple material elements; it is the case with palms and vines, (which constitute) the last stage of plants, in their relation to snails and shellfish, (which constitute) the (lowest) stage of animals. It is also the case with monkeys, creatures combining in themselves cleverness and perception, in their relation to man, the being who has the ability to think and to reflect. The preparedness (for transformation) that exists on either side, at each stage of the worlds, is meant when (we speak about) their connection.

=== Thomas Aquinas on creation and natural processes ===
While most Christian theologians held that the natural world was part of an unchanging designed hierarchy, some theologians speculated that the world might have developed through natural processes. Thomas Aquinas expounded on Augustine of Hippo's early idea of theistic evolution

On the day on which God created the heaven and the earth, He created also every plant of the field, not, indeed, actually, but 'before it sprung up in the earth,' that is, potentially... All things were not distinguished and adorned together, not from a want of power on God's part, as requiring time in which to work, but that due order might be observed in the instituting of the world.

He saw that the autonomy of nature was a sign of God's goodness, and detected no conflict between a divinely created universe and the idea that the universe had developed over time through natural mechanisms. However, Aquinas disputed the views of those (like the ancient Greek philosopher Empedocles) who held that such natural processes showed that the universe could have developed without an underlying purpose. Aquinas rather held that: "Hence, it is clear that nature is nothing but a certain kind of art, i.e., the divine art, impressed upon things, by which these things are moved to a determinate end. It is as if the shipbuilder were able to give to timbers that by which they would move themselves to take the form of a ship."

== Scientific Revolution and Enlightenment ==
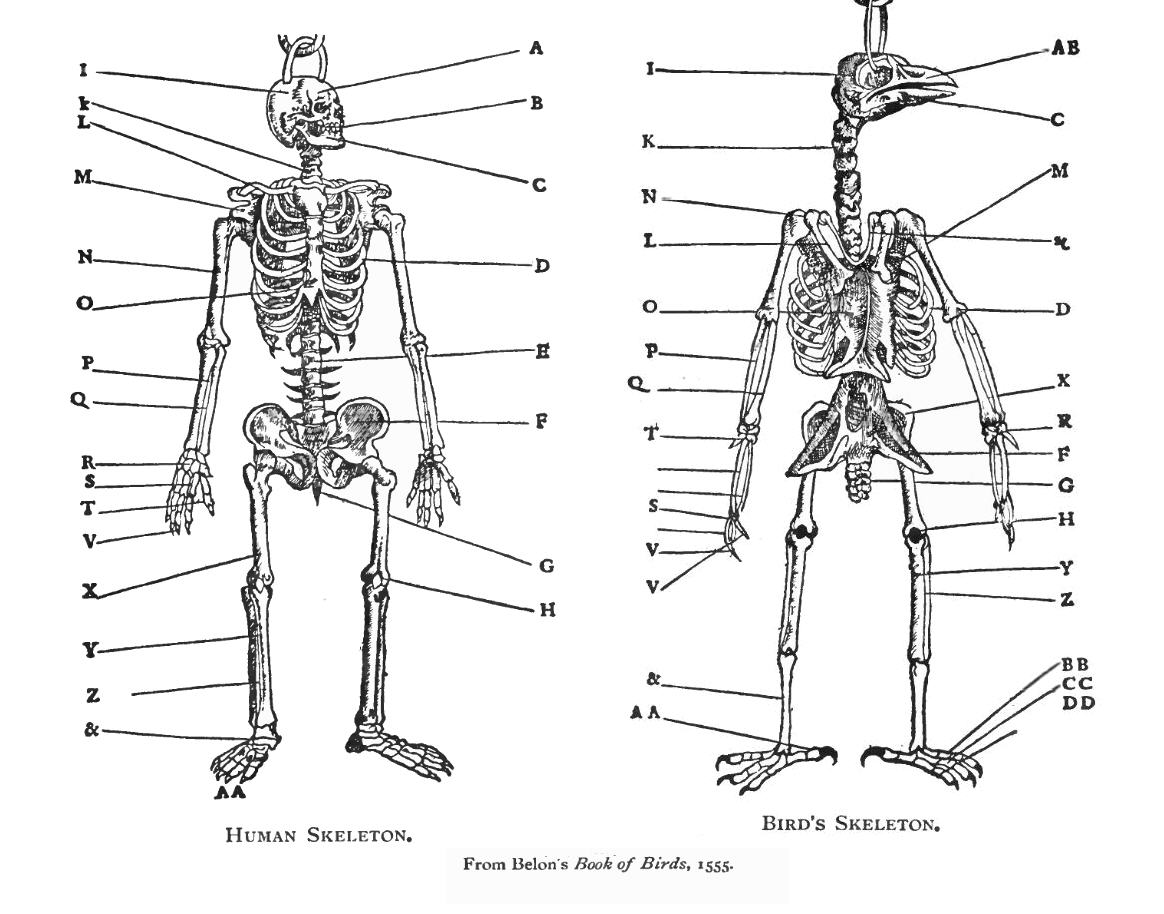
Pierre Belon compared the skeletons of humans (left) and birds (right) in his L'Histoire de la nature des oyseaux (The Natural History of Birds) (1555).

In the first half of the 17th century, René Descartes' mechanical philosophy encouraged the use of the metaphor of the universe as a machine, a concept that would come to characterise the Scientific Revolution. Between 1650 and 1800, some naturalists, such as Benoît de Maillet, produced theories that maintained that the universe, the Earth, and life, had developed mechanically, without divine guidance. In contrast, most contemporary theories of evolution, such of those of Gottfried Leibniz and Johann Gottfried Herder, regarded evolution as a fundamentally spiritual process. In 1751, Pierre Louis Maupertuis veered toward more materialist ground. He wrote of natural modifications occurring during reproduction and accumulating over the course of many generations, producing races and even new species, a description that anticipated in general terms the concept of natural selection.

Maupertuis' ideas were in opposition to the influence of early taxonomists like John Ray. In the late 17th century, Ray had given the first formal definition of a biological species, which he described as being characterized by essential unchanging features, and stated the seed of one species could never give rise to another. The ideas of Ray and other 17th-century taxonomists were influenced by natural theology and the argument from design.

The word evolution (from the Latin evolutio, meaning "to unroll like a scroll") was initially used to refer to embryological development; its first use in relation to development of species came in 1762, when Charles Bonnet used it for his concept of "pre-formation," in which females carried a miniature form of all future generations. The term gradually gained a more general meaning of growth or progressive development.

Later in the 18th century, the French philosopher Georges-Louis Leclerc, Comte de Buffon, one of the leading naturalists of the time, suggested that what most people referred to as species were really just well-marked varieties, modified from an original form by environmental factors. For example, he believed that lions, tigers, leopards, and house cats might all have a common ancestor. He further speculated that the 200 or so species of mammals then known might have descended from as few as 38 original animal forms. Buffon's evolutionary ideas were limited; he believed each of the original forms had arisen through spontaneous generation and that each was shaped by "internal moulds" that limited the amount of change. Buffon's works, Histoire naturelle (1749–1789) and Époques de la nature (1778), containing well-developed theories about a completely materialistic origin for the Earth and his ideas questioning the fixity of species, were extremely influential. Another French philosopher, Denis Diderot, also wrote that living things might have first arisen through spontaneous generation, and that species were always changing through a constant process of experiment where new forms arose and survived or not based on trial and error; an idea that can be considered a partial anticipation of natural selection. Between 1767 and 1792, James Burnett, Lord Monboddo, included in his writings not only the concept that man had descended from primates, but also that, in response to the environment, creatures had found methods of transforming their characteristics over long time intervals. Charles Darwin's grandfather, Erasmus Darwin, published Zoonomia (1794–1796) which suggested that "all warm-blooded animals have arisen from one living filament." In his poem Temple of Nature (1803), he described the rise of life from minute organisms living in mud to all of its modern diversity.

== Early 19th century ==
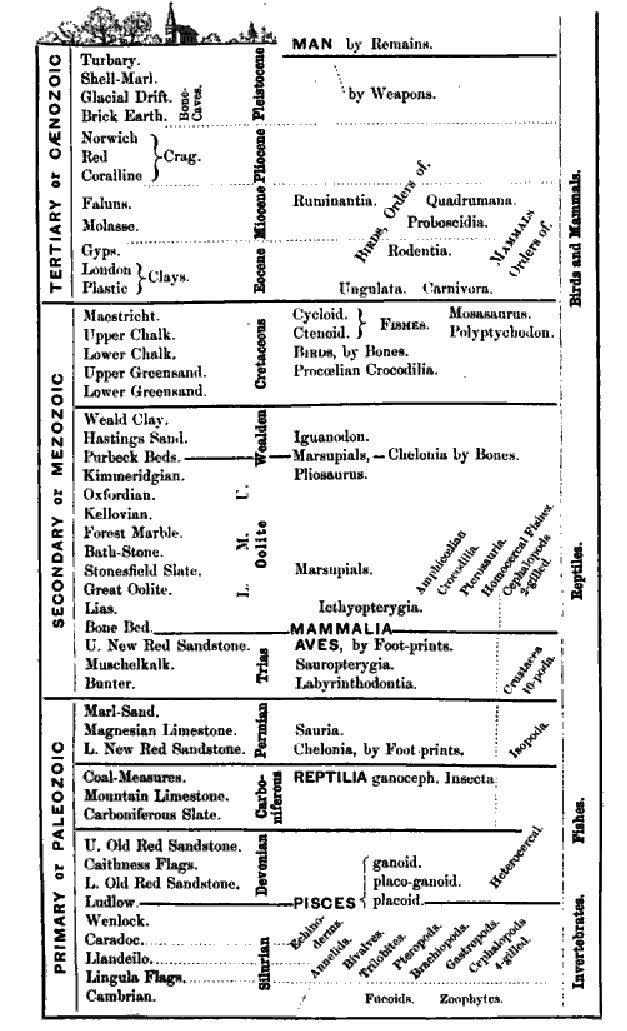
Richard Owen's 1861 geological timescale from Palæontology, showing the appearance of major animal types

=== Paleontology and geology ===
In 1796, Georges Cuvier published his findings on the differences between living elephants and those found in the fossil record. His analysis identified mammoths and mastodons as distinct species, different from any living animal, and effectively ended a long-running debate over whether a species could become extinct. In 1788, James Hutton described gradual geological processes operating continuously over deep time. In the 1790s, William Smith began the process of ordering rock strata by examining fossils in the layers while he worked on his geologic map of England. Independently, in 1811, Cuvier and Alexandre Brongniart published an influential study of the geologic history of the region around Paris, based on the stratigraphic succession of rock layers. These works helped establish the antiquity of the Earth. Cuvier advocated catastrophism to explain the patterns of extinction and faunal succession revealed by the fossil record.

Knowledge of the fossil record continued to advance rapidly during the first few decades of the 19th century. By the 1840s, the outlines of the geologic timescale were becoming clear, and in 1841 John Phillips named three major eras, based on the predominant fauna of each: the Paleozoic, dominated by marine invertebrates and fish, the Mesozoic, the age of reptiles, and the current Cenozoic age of mammals. This progressive picture of the history of life was accepted even by conservative English geologists like Adam Sedgwick and William Buckland; however, like Cuvier, they attributed the progression to repeated catastrophic episodes of extinction followed by new episodes of creation. Unlike Cuvier, Buckland and some other advocates of natural theology among British geologists made efforts to explicitly link the last catastrophic episode proposed by Cuvier to the biblical flood.

From 1830 to 1833, geologist Charles Lyell published his multi-volume work Principles of Geology, which, building on Hutton's ideas, advocated a uniformitarian alternative to the catastrophic theory of geology. Lyell claimed that, rather than being the products of cataclysmic (and possibly supernatural) events, the geologic features of the Earth are better explained as the result of the same gradual geologic forces observable in the present day—but acting over immensely long periods of time. Although Lyell opposed evolutionary ideas (even questioning the consensus that the fossil record demonstrates a true progression), his concept that the Earth was shaped by forces working gradually over an extended period, and the immense age of the Earth assumed by his theories, would strongly influence future evolutionary thinkers such as Charles Darwin.

=== Transmutation of species ===
Lamarck's two-factor theory involves a complexifying force driving animal body plans towards higher levels (orthogenesis) creating a ladder of phyla, and an adaptive force causing animals with a given body plan to adapt to circumstances (use and disuse, inheritance of acquired characteristics), creating a diversity of species and genera.

Jean-Baptiste Lamarck proposed, in his Philosophie zoologique of 1809, a theory of the transmutation of species (transformisme). Lamarck did not believe that all living things shared a common ancestor but rather that simple forms of life were created continuously by spontaneous generation. He also believed that an innate life force drove species to become more complex over time, advancing up a linear ladder of complexity that was related to the great chain of being. Lamarck recognized that species adapted to their environment. He explained this by saying that the same innate force driving increasing complexity caused the organs of an animal (or a plant) to change based on the use or disuse of those organs, just as exercise affects muscles. He argued that these changes would be inherited by the next generation and produce slow adaptation to the environment. It was this secondary mechanism of adaptation through the inheritance of acquired characteristics that would become known as Lamarckism and would influence discussions of evolution into the 20th century.

A radical British school of comparative anatomy that included the anatomist Robert Edmond Grant was closely in touch with Lamarck's French school of Transformationism. One of the French scientists who influenced Grant was the anatomist Étienne Geoffroy Saint-Hilaire, whose ideas on the unity of various animal body plans and the homology of certain anatomical structures would be widely influential and lead to intense debate with his colleague Georges Cuvier. Grant became an authority on the anatomy and reproduction of marine invertebrates. He developed Lamarck's and Erasmus Darwin's ideas of transmutation and evolutionism, and investigated homology, even proposing that plants and animals had a common evolutionary starting point. As a young student, Charles Darwin joined Grant in investigations of the life cycle of marine animals. In 1826, an anonymous paper, probably written by Robert Jameson, praised Lamarck for explaining how higher animals had "evolved" from the simplest worms; this was the first use of the word "evolved" in a modern sense.

Robert Chambers's Vestiges of the Natural History of Creation (1844) shows fishes (F), reptiles (R), and birds (B) branching from a path leading to mammals (M).

In 1844, the Scottish publisher Robert Chambers anonymously published an extremely controversial but widely read book entitled Vestiges of the Natural History of Creation. This book proposed an evolutionary scenario for the origins of the Solar System and of life on Earth. It claimed that the fossil record showed a progressive ascent of animals, with current animals branching off a main line that leads progressively to humanity. It implied that the transmutations lead to the unfolding of a preordained plan that had been woven into the laws that governed the universe. In this sense it was less completely materialistic than the ideas of radicals like Grant, but its implication that humans were only the last step in the ascent of animal life incensed many conservative thinkers. The high profile of the public debate over Vestiges, with its depiction of evolution as a progressive process, would greatly influence the perception of Darwin's theory a decade later.

Ideas about the transmutation of species were associated with the radical materialism of the Enlightenment and were attacked by more conservative thinkers. Cuvier attacked the ideas of Lamarck and Geoffroy, agreeing with Aristotle that species were immutable. Cuvier believed that the individual parts of an animal were too closely correlated with one another to allow for one part of the anatomy to change in isolation from the others, and argued that the fossil record showed patterns of catastrophic extinctions followed by repopulation, rather than gradual change over time. He also noted that drawings of animals and animal mummies from Egypt, which were thousands of years old, showed no signs of change when compared with modern animals. The strength of Cuvier's arguments and his scientific reputation helped keep transmutational ideas out of the mainstream for decades.

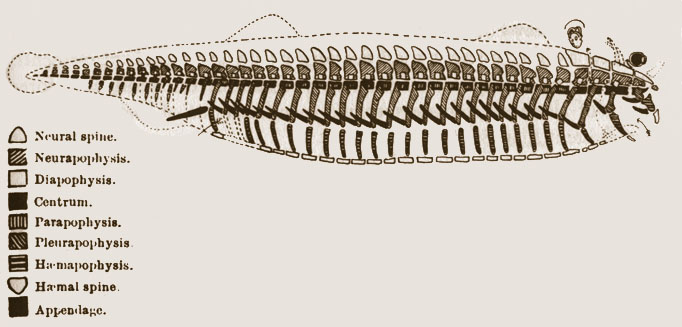
Richard Owen's 1848 diagram shows his conceptual archetype for all vertebrates.

In Great Britain, the philosophy of natural theology remained influential. William Paley's 1802 book Natural Theology with its famous watchmaker analogy had been written at least in part as a response to the transmutational ideas of Erasmus Darwin. Geologists influenced by natural theology, such as Buckland and Sedgwick, made a regular practice of attacking the evolutionary ideas of Lamarck, Grant, and Vestiges. Although Charles Lyell opposed scriptural geology, he also believed in the immutability of species, and in his Principles of Geology, he criticized Lamarck's theories of development. Idealists such as Louis Agassiz and Richard Owen believed that each species was fixed and unchangeable because it represented an idea in the mind of the creator. They believed that relationships between species could be discerned from developmental patterns in embryology, as well as in the fossil record, but that these relationships represented an underlying pattern of divine thought, with progressive creation leading to increasing complexity and culminating in humanity. Owen developed the idea of "archetypes" in the Divine mind that would produce a sequence of species related by anatomical homologies, such as vertebrate limbs. Owen led a public campaign that successfully marginalized Grant in the scientific community. Darwin would make good use of the homologies analyzed by Owen in his own theory, but the harsh treatment of Grant, and the controversy surrounding Vestiges, showed him the need to ensure that his own ideas were scientifically sound.

=== Anticipations of natural selection ===
It is possible to look through the history of biology from the ancient Greeks onwards and discover anticipations of almost all of Charles Darwin's key ideas. As an example, Loren Eiseley has found isolated passages written by Buffon suggesting he was almost ready to piece together a theory of natural selection, but states that such anticipations should not be taken out of the full context of the writings or of cultural values of the time which made Darwinian ideas of evolution unthinkable.

When Darwin was developing his theory, he investigated selective breeding and was impressed by John Sebright's observation that "A severe winter, or a scarcity of food, by destroying the weak and the unhealthy, has all the good effects of the most skilful selection" so that "the weak and the unhealthy do not live to propagate their infirmities." Darwin was influenced by Charles Lyell's ideas of environmental change causing ecological shifts, leading to what Augustin de Candolle had called a war between competing plant species, competition well described by the botanist William Herbert. Darwin was struck by Thomas Robert Malthus' phrase "struggle for existence" used of warring human tribes.

Several writers anticipated evolutionary aspects of Darwin's theory, and in the third edition of On the Origin of Species published in 1861 Darwin named those he knew about in an introductory appendix, An Historical Sketch of the Recent Progress of Opinion on the Origin of Species, which he expanded in later editions.

In 1813, William Charles Wells read before the Royal Society essays assuming that there had been evolution of humans, and recognising the principle of natural selection. Darwin and Alfred Russel Wallace were unaware of this work when they jointly published the theory in 1858, but Darwin later acknowledged that Wells had recognised the principle before them, writing that the paper "An Account of a White Female, part of whose Skin resembles that of a Negro" was published in 1818, and "he distinctly recognises the principle of natural selection, and this is the first recognition which has been indicated; but he applies it only to the races of man, and to certain characters alone."

Patrick Matthew wrote in his book On Naval Timber and Arboriculture (1831) of "continual balancing of life to circumstance. ... [The] progeny of the same parents, under great differences of circumstance, might, in several generations, even become distinct species, incapable of co-reproduction." Darwin implies that he discovered this work after the initial publication of the Origin. In the brief historical sketch that Darwin included in the third edition he says "Unfortunately the view was given by Mr. Matthew very briefly in scattered passages in an Appendix to a work on a different subject ... He clearly saw, however, the full force of the principle of natural selection."

However, as historian of science Peter J. Bowler says, "Through a combination of bold theorizing and comprehensive evaluation, Darwin came up with a concept of evolution that was unique for the time." Bowler goes on to say that simple priority alone is not enough to secure a place in the history of science; someone has to develop an idea and convince others of its importance to have a real impact. Thomas Henry Huxley said in his essay on the reception of On the Origin of Species:

The suggestion that new species may result from the selective action of external conditions upon the variations from their specific type which individuals present—and which we call "spontaneous," because we are ignorant of their causation—is as wholly unknown to the historian of scientific ideas as it was to biological specialists before 1858. But that suggestion is the central idea of the 'Origin of Species,' and contains the quintessence of Darwinism.

=== Natural selection ===
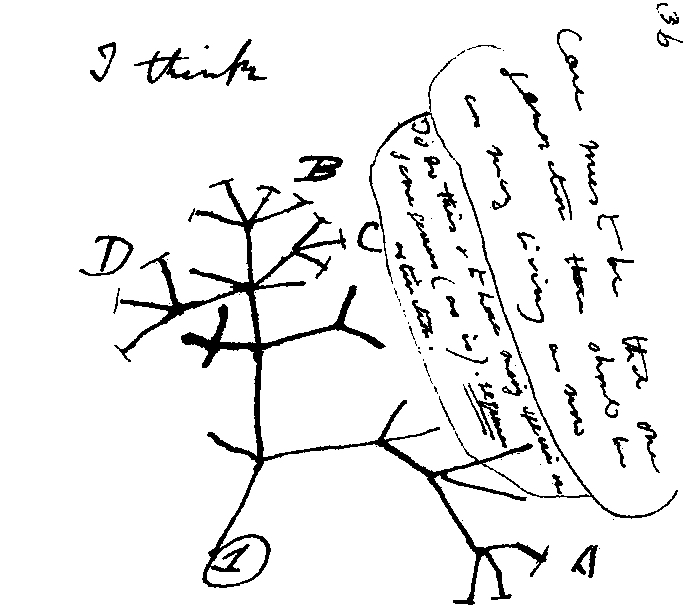
Charles Darwin's first sketch of an evolutionary tree from his "B" notebook on the transmutation of species (1837–1838)

The biogeographical patterns Charles Darwin observed in places such as the Galápagos Islands during the second voyage of HMS Beagle caused him to doubt the fixity of species, and in 1837 Darwin started the first of a series of secret notebooks on transmutation. Darwin's observations led him to view transmutation as a process of divergence and branching, rather than the ladder-like progression envisioned by Jean-Baptiste Lamarck and others. In 1838 he read the new sixth edition of An Essay on the Principle of Population, written in the late 18th century by Thomas Robert Malthus. Malthus' idea of population growth leading to a struggle for survival combined with Darwin's knowledge on how breeders selected traits, led to the inception of Darwin's theory of natural selection. Darwin did not publish his ideas on evolution for 20 years. However, he did share them with certain other naturalists and friends, starting with Joseph Dalton Hooker, with whom he discussed his unpublished 1844 essay on natural selection. During this period he used the time he could spare from his other scientific work to slowly refine his ideas and, aware of the intense controversy around transmutation, amass evidence to support them. In September 1854 he began full-time work on writing his book on natural selection.

Unlike Darwin, Alfred Russel Wallace, influenced by the book Vestiges of the Natural History of Creation, already suspected that transmutation of species occurred when he began his career as a naturalist. By 1855, his biogeographical observations during his field work in South America and the Malay Archipelago made him confident enough in a branching pattern of evolution to publish a paper stating that every species originated in close proximity to an already existing closely allied species. Like Darwin, it was Wallace's consideration of how the ideas of Malthus might apply to animal populations that led him to conclusions very similar to those reached by Darwin about the role of natural selection. In February 1858, Wallace, unaware of Darwin's unpublished ideas, composed his thoughts into an essay and mailed them to Darwin, asking for his opinion. The result was the joint publication in July of an extract from Darwin's 1844 essay along with Wallace's letter. Darwin also began work on a short abstract summarising his theory, which he would publish in 1859 as On the Origin of Species.

== 1859–1930s: Darwin and his legacy ==
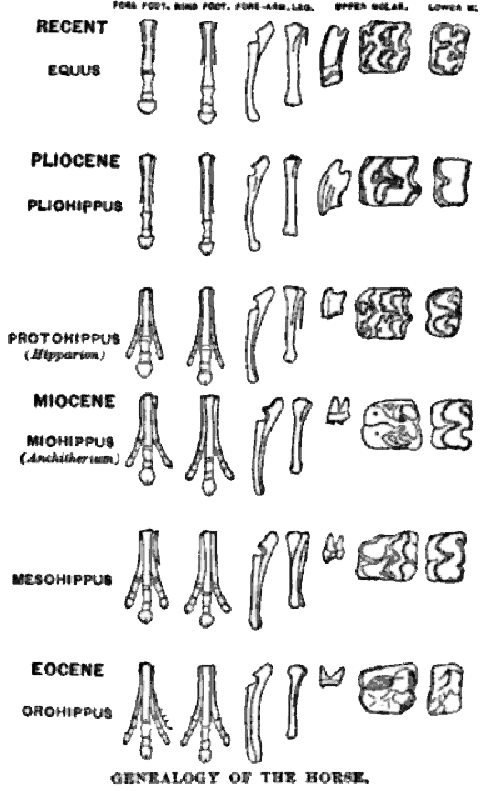
Othniel Charles Marsh's diagram of the evolution of horse feet and teeth over time as reproduced in Thomas Henry Huxley's Prof. Huxley in America (1876)

By the 1850s, whether or not species evolved was a subject of intense debate, with prominent scientists arguing both sides of the issue. The publication of Charles Darwin's On the Origin of Species fundamentally transformed the discussion over biological origins. Darwin argued that his branching version of evolution explained a wealth of facts in biogeography, anatomy, embryology, and other fields of biology. He also provided the first cogent mechanism by which evolutionary change could persist: his theory of natural selection.

One of the first and most important naturalists to be convinced by Origin of the reality of evolution was the British anatomist Thomas Henry Huxley. Huxley recognized that unlike the earlier transmutational ideas of Jean-Baptiste Lamarck and Vestiges of the Natural History of Creation, Darwin's theory provided a mechanism for evolution without supernatural involvement, even if Huxley himself was not completely convinced that natural selection was the key evolutionary mechanism. Huxley would make advocacy of evolution a cornerstone of the program of the X Club to reform and professionalise science by displacing natural theology with naturalism and to end the domination of British natural science by the clergy. By the early 1870s in English-speaking countries, thanks partly to these efforts, evolution had become the mainstream scientific explanation for the origin of species. In his campaign for public and scientific acceptance of Darwin's theory, Huxley made extensive use of new evidence for evolution from paleontology. This included evidence that birds had evolved from reptiles, including the discovery of Archaeopteryx in Europe, and a number of fossils of primitive birds with teeth found in North America. Another important line of evidence was the finding of fossils that helped trace the evolution of the horse from its small five-toed ancestors. However, acceptance of evolution among scientists in non-English speaking nations such as France, and the countries of southern Europe and Latin America was slower. An exception to this was Germany, where both August Weismann and Ernst Haeckel championed this idea: Haeckel used evolution to challenge the established tradition of metaphysical idealism in German biology, much as Huxley used it to challenge natural theology in Britain. Haeckel and other German scientists would take the lead in launching an ambitious programme to reconstruct the evolutionary history of life based on morphology and embryology.

Darwin's theory succeeded in profoundly altering scientific opinion regarding the development of life and in producing a small philosophical revolution. However, this theory could not explain several critical components of the evolutionary process. Specifically, Darwin was unable to explain the source of variation in traits within a species, and could not identify a mechanism that could pass traits faithfully from one generation to the next. Darwin's hypothesis of pangenesis, while relying in part on the inheritance of acquired characteristics, proved to be useful for statistical models of evolution that were developed by his cousin Francis Galton and the "biometric" school of evolutionary thought. However, this idea proved to be of little use to other biologists.

=== Application to humans ===
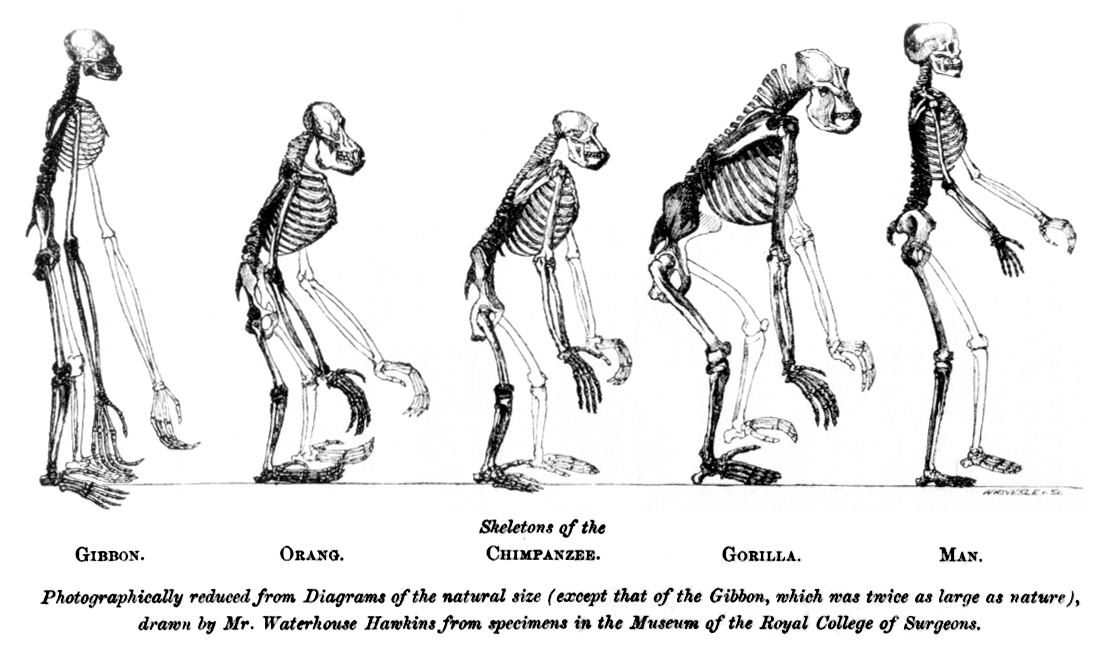
This illustration (the root of The March of Progress) was the frontispiece of Thomas Henry Huxley's book Evidence as to Man's Place in Nature (1863). Huxley applied Darwin's ideas to humans, using comparative anatomy to show that humans and apes had a common ancestor, which challenged the theologically important idea that humans held a unique place in the universe.

Charles Darwin was aware of the severe reaction in some parts of the scientific community against the suggestion made in Vestiges of the Natural History of Creation that humans had arisen from animals by a process of transmutation. Therefore, he almost completely ignored the topic of human evolution in On the Origin of Species. Despite this precaution, the issue featured prominently in the debate that followed the book's publication. For most of the first half of the 19th century, the scientific community believed that, although geology had shown that the Earth and life were very old, human beings had appeared suddenly just a few thousand years before the present. However, a series of archaeological discoveries in the 1840s and 1850s showed stone tools associated with the remains of extinct animals. By the early 1860s, as summarized in Charles Lyell's 1863 book Geological Evidences of the Antiquity of Man, it had become widely accepted that humans had existed during a prehistoric period—which stretched many thousands of years before the start of written history. This view of human history was more compatible with an evolutionary origin for humanity than was the older view. On the other hand, at that time there was no fossil evidence to demonstrate human evolution. The only human fossils found before the discovery of Java Man in the 1890s were either of anatomically modern humans or of Neanderthals that were too close, especially in the critical characteristic of cranial capacity, to modern humans for them to be convincing intermediates between humans and other primates.

Therefore, the debate that immediately followed the publication of On the Origin of Species centered on the similarities and differences between humans and modern apes. Carolus Linnaeus had been criticised in the 18th century for grouping humans and apes together as primates in his ground breaking classification system. Richard Owen vigorously defended the classification suggested by Georges Cuvier and Johann Friedrich Blumenbach that placed humans in a separate order from any of the other mammals, which by the early 19th century had become the orthodox view. On the other hand, Thomas Henry Huxley sought to demonstrate a close anatomical relationship between humans and apes. In one famous incident, which became known as the Great Hippocampus Question, Huxley showed that Owen was mistaken in claiming that the brains of gorillas lacked a structure present in human brains. Huxley summarized his argument in his highly influential 1863 book Evidence as to Man's Place in Nature. Another viewpoint was advocated by Lyell and Alfred Russel Wallace. They agreed that humans shared a common ancestor with apes, but questioned whether any purely materialistic mechanism could account for all the differences between humans and apes, especially some aspects of the human mind.

In 1871, Darwin published The Descent of Man, and Selection in Relation to Sex, which contained his views on human evolution. Darwin argued that the differences between the human mind and the minds of the higher animals were a matter of degree rather than of kind. For example, he viewed morality as a natural outgrowth of instincts that were beneficial to animals living in social groups. He argued that all the differences between humans and apes were explained by a combination of the selective pressures that came from our ancestors moving from the trees to the plains, and sexual selection. The debate over human origins, and over the degree of human uniqueness continued well into the 20th century.

=== Alternatives to natural selection ===
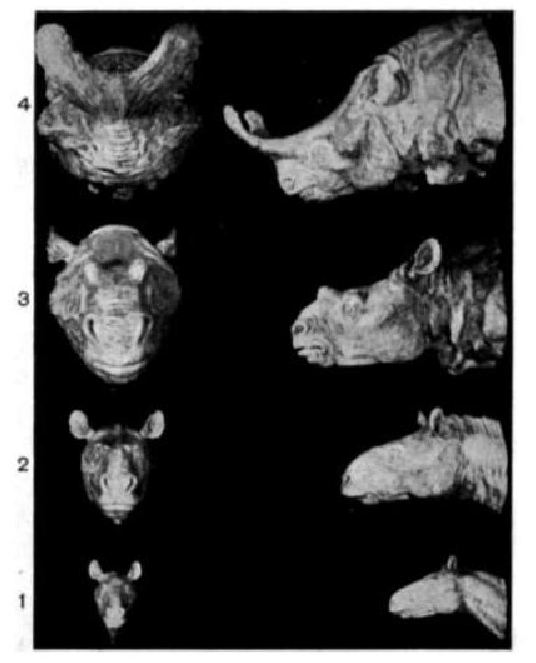
This photo from Henry Fairfield Osborn's 1917 book Origin and Evolution of Life shows models depicting the evolution of Titanothere horns over time, which Osborn claimed was an example of an orthogenetic trend in evolution.

The concept of evolution was widely accepted in scientific circles within a few years of the publication of Origin, but the acceptance of natural selection as its driving mechanism was much less widespread. The four major alternatives to natural selection in the late 19th century were theistic evolution, neo-Lamarckism, orthogenesis, and saltationism. Alternatives supported by biologists at other times included structuralism, Georges Cuvier's teleological but non-evolutionary functionalism, and vitalism.

Theistic evolution was the idea that God intervened in the process of evolution, to guide it in such a way that the living world could still be considered to be designed. The term was promoted by Charles Darwin's greatest American advocate Asa Gray. However, this idea gradually fell out of favor among scientists, as they became more and more committed to the idea of methodological naturalism and came to believe that direct appeals to supernatural involvement were scientifically unproductive. By 1900, theistic evolution had largely disappeared from professional scientific discussions, although it retained a strong popular following.

In the late 19th century, the term neo-Lamarckism came to be associated with the position of naturalists who viewed the inheritance of acquired characteristics as the most important evolutionary mechanism. Advocates of this position included the British writer and Darwin critic Samuel Butler, the German biologist Ernst Haeckel, and the American paleontologist Edward Drinker Cope. They considered Lamarckism to be philosophically superior to Darwin's idea of selection acting on random variation. Cope looked for, and thought he found, patterns of linear progression in the fossil record. Inheritance of acquired characteristics was part of Haeckel's recapitulation theory of evolution, which held that the embryological development of an organism repeats its evolutionary history. Critics of neo-Lamarckism, such as the German biologist August Weismann and Alfred Russel Wallace, pointed out that no one had ever produced solid evidence for the inheritance of acquired characteristics. Despite these criticisms, neo-Lamarckism remained the most popular alternative to natural selection at the end of the 19th century, and would remain the position of some naturalists well into the 20th century.

Orthogenesis was the hypothesis that life has an innate tendency to change, in a unilinear fashion, towards ever-greater perfection. It had a significant following in the 19th century, and its proponents included the Russian biologist Leo S. Berg and the American paleontologist Henry Fairfield Osborn. Orthogenesis was popular among some paleontologists, who believed that the fossil record showed a gradual and constant unidirectional change.

Saltationism was the idea that new species arise as a result of large mutations. It was seen as a much faster alternative to the Darwinian concept of a gradual process of small random variations being acted on by natural selection, and was popular with early geneticists such as Hugo de Vries, William Bateson, and early in his career, Thomas Hunt Morgan. It became the basis of the mutation theory of evolution.

=== Mendelian genetics, biometrics, and mutation ===
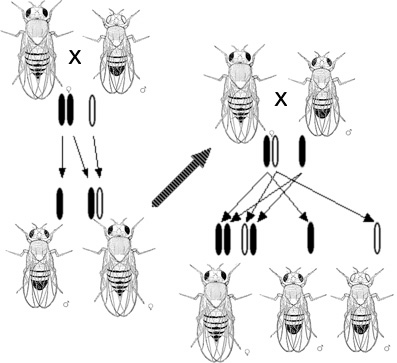
Diagram from Thomas Hunt Morgan's 1919 book The Physical Basis of Heredity, showing the sex-linked inheritance of the white-eyed mutation in Drosophila melanogaster

The rediscovery of Gregor Mendel's laws of inheritance in 1900 ignited a fierce debate between two camps of biologists. In one camp were the Mendelians, who were focused on discrete variations and the laws of inheritance. They were led by William Bateson (who coined the word genetics) and Hugo de Vries (who coined the word mutation). Their opponents were the biometricians, who were interested in the continuous variation of characteristics within populations. Their leaders, Karl Pearson and Walter Frank Raphael Weldon, followed in the tradition of Francis Galton, who had focused on measurement and statistical analysis of variation within a population. The biometricians rejected Mendelian genetics on the basis that discrete units of heredity, such as genes, could not explain the continuous range of variation seen in real populations. Weldon's work with crabs and snails provided evidence that selection pressure from the environment could shift the range of variation in wild populations, but the Mendelians maintained that the variations measured by biometricians were too insignificant to account for the evolution of new species.

When Thomas Hunt Morgan began experimenting with breeding the fruit fly Drosophila melanogaster, he was a saltationist who hoped to demonstrate that a new species could be created in the lab by mutation alone. Instead, the work at his lab between 1910 and 1915 reconfirmed Mendelian genetics and provided solid experimental evidence linking it to chromosomal inheritance. His work also demonstrated that most mutations had relatively small effects, such as a change in eye color, and that rather than creating a new species in a single step, mutations served to increase variation within the existing population.

== 1920s–1940s ==
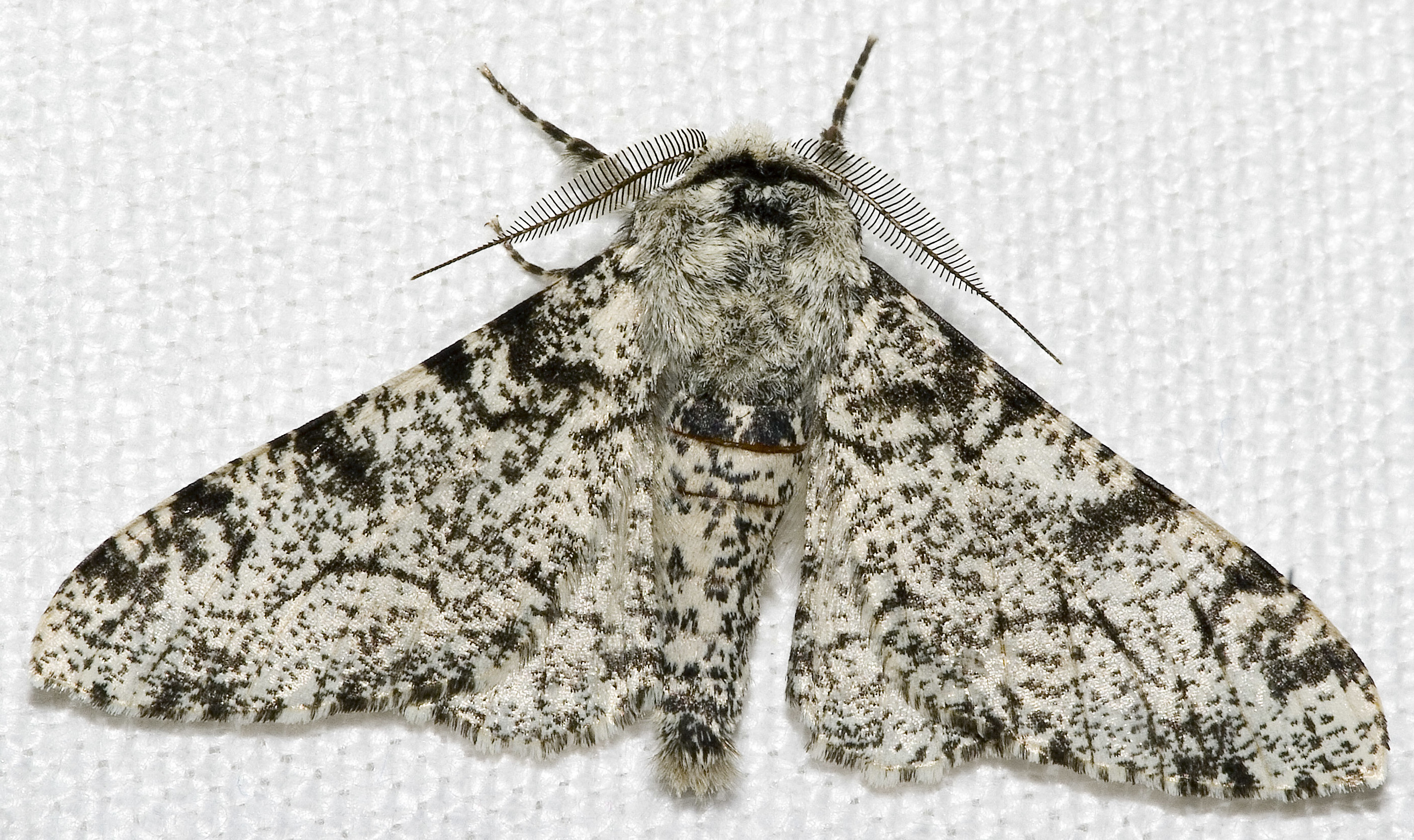
Biston betularia f. typica is the white-bodied form of the peppered moth.

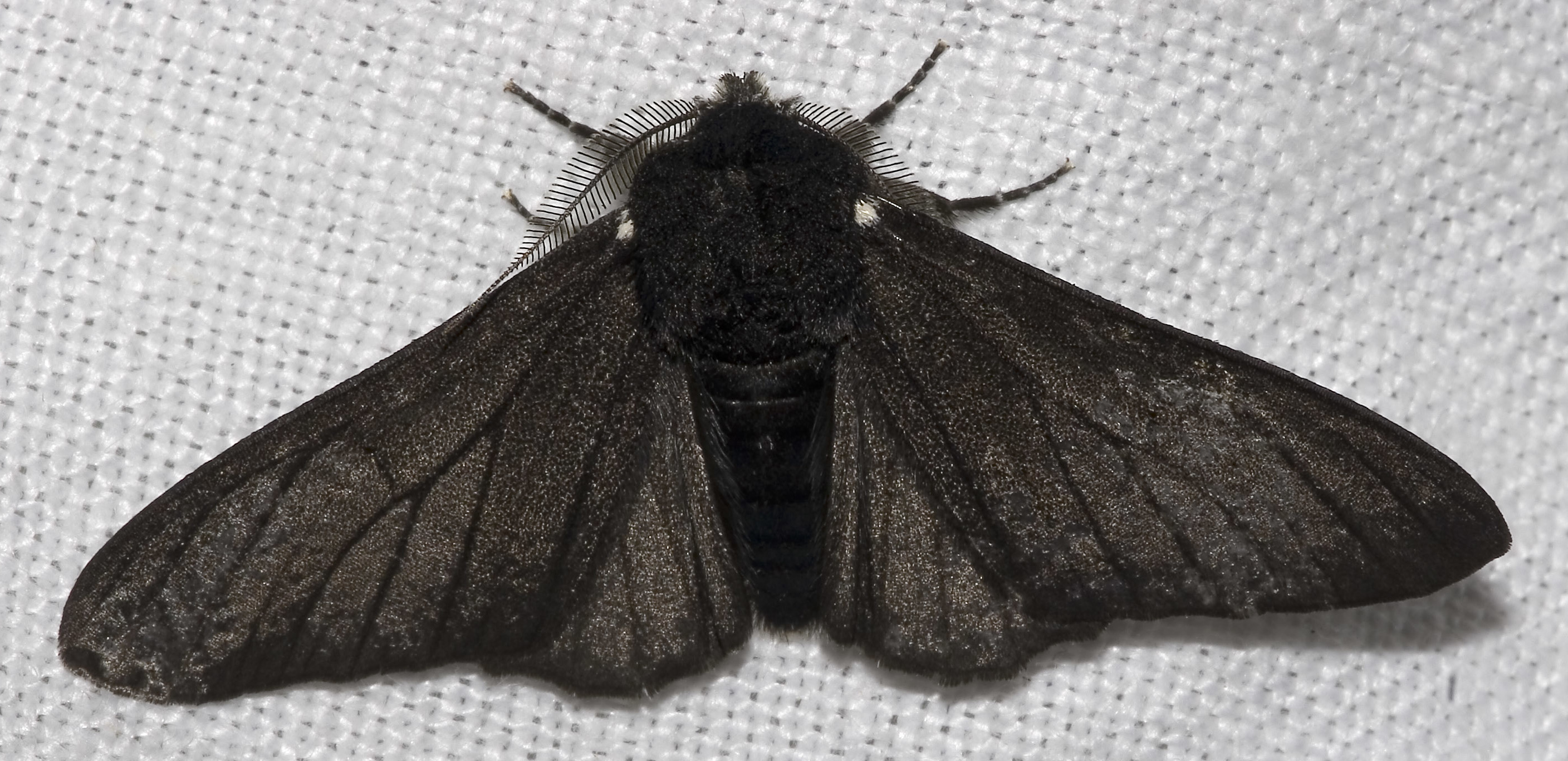
Biston betularia f. carbonaria is the black-bodied form of the peppered moth.

=== Population genetics ===
The Mendelian and biometrician models were eventually reconciled through the development of population genetics. A key step was the work of the British biologist and statistician Ronald Fisher. In a series of papers starting in 1918 and culminating in his 1930 book The Genetical Theory of Natural Selection, Fisher showed that the continuous variation measured by the biometricians could be produced by the combined action of many discrete genes, and that natural selection could change gene frequencies in a population, resulting in evolution. In a series of papers beginning in 1924, another British geneticist, J. B. S. Haldane, applied statistical analysis to real-world examples of natural selection, such as the evolution of industrial melanism in peppered moths, and showed that natural selection worked at an even faster rate than Fisher assumed.

The American biologist Sewall Wright, who had a background in animal breeding experiments, focused on combinations of interacting genes, and the effects of inbreeding on small, relatively isolated populations that exhibited genetic drift. In 1932, Wright introduced the concept of an adaptive landscape and argued that genetic drift and inbreeding could drive a small, isolated sub-population away from an adaptive peak, allowing natural selection to drive it towards different adaptive peaks. The work of Fisher, Haldane and Wright founded the discipline of population genetics. This integrated natural selection with Mendelian genetics, which was the critical first step in developing a unified theory of how evolution worked.

=== Modern synthesis ===
Several major ideas about evolution came together in the population genetics of the early 20th century to form the modern synthesis, including genetic variation, natural selection, and particulate (Mendelian) inheritance. This ended the eclipse of Darwinism and supplanted a variety of non-Darwinian theories of evolution.

In the early 20th century, most field naturalists continued to believe that alternative mechanisms of evolution such as Lamarckism and orthogenesis provided the best explanation for the complexity they observed in the living world. But as the field of genetics continued to develop, those views became less tenable. Theodosius Dobzhansky, a postdoctoral worker in Thomas Hunt Morgan's lab, had been influenced by the work on genetic diversity by Russian geneticists such as Sergei Chetverikov. He helped to bridge the divide between the foundations of microevolution developed by the population geneticists and the patterns of macroevolution observed by field biologists, with his 1937 book Genetics and the Origin of Species. Dobzhansky examined the genetic diversity of wild populations and showed that, contrary to the assumptions of the population geneticists, these populations had large amounts of genetic diversity, with marked differences between sub-populations. The book also took the highly mathematical work of the population geneticists and put it into a more accessible form. In Britain, E. B. Ford, the pioneer of ecological genetics, continued throughout the 1930s and 1940s to demonstrate the power of selection due to ecological factors including the ability to maintain genetic diversity through genetic polymorphisms such as human blood types. Ford's work would contribute to a shift in emphasis during the course of the modern synthesis towards natural selection over genetic drift.

The evolutionary biologist Ernst Mayr was influenced by the work of the German biologist Bernhard Rensch showing the influence of local environmental factors on the geographic distribution of sub-species and closely related species. Mayr followed up on Dobzhansky's work with the 1942 book Systematics and the Origin of Species, which emphasized the importance of allopatric speciation in the formation of new species. This form of speciation occurs when the geographical isolation of a sub-population is followed by the development of mechanisms for reproductive isolation. Mayr also formulated the biological species concept that defined a species as a group of interbreeding or potentially interbreeding populations that were reproductively isolated from all other populations.

In the 1944 book Tempo and Mode in Evolution, George Gaylord Simpson showed that the fossil record was consistent with the irregular non-directional pattern predicted by the developing evolutionary synthesis, and that the linear trends that earlier paleontologists had claimed supported orthogenesis and neo-Lamarckism did not hold up to closer examination. In 1950, G. Ledyard Stebbins published Variation and Evolution in Plants, which helped to integrate botany into the synthesis. The emerging cross-disciplinary consensus on the workings of evolution would be known as the modern synthesis. It received its name from the 1942 book Evolution: The Modern Synthesis by Julian Huxley.

The modern synthesis provided a conceptual core—in particular, natural selection and Mendelian population genetics—that tied together many, but not all, biological disciplines: developmental biology was one of the omissions. It helped establish the legitimacy of evolutionary biology, a primarily historical science, in a scientific climate that favored experimental methods over historical ones. The synthesis also resulted in a considerable narrowing of the range of mainstream evolutionary thought (what Stephen Jay Gould called the "hardening of the synthesis"): by the 1950s, natural selection acting on genetic variation was virtually the only acceptable mechanism of evolutionary change (panselectionism), and macroevolution was simply considered the result of extensive microevolution.

== 1940s–1960s: Molecular biology and evolution ==
The middle decades of the 20th century saw the rise of molecular biology, and with it an understanding of the chemical nature of genes as sequences of DNA and of their relationship—through the genetic code—to protein sequences. Increasingly powerful techniques for analyzing proteins, such as protein electrophoresis and sequencing, brought biochemical phenomena into the realm of the synthetic theory of evolution. In the early 1960s, biochemists Linus Pauling and Emile Zuckerkandl proposed the molecular clock hypothesis (MCH): that sequence differences between homologous proteins could be used to calculate the time since two species diverged. By 1969, Motoo Kimura and others provided a theoretical basis for the molecular clock, arguing that—at the molecular level at least—most genetic mutations are neither harmful nor helpful and that mutation and genetic drift (rather than natural selection) cause a large portion of genetic change: the neutral theory of molecular evolution. Studies of protein differences within species also brought molecular data to bear on population genetics by providing estimates of the level of heterozygosity in natural populations.

From the early 1960s, molecular biology was increasingly seen as a threat to the traditional core of evolutionary biology. Established evolutionary biologists—particularly Ernst Mayr, Theodosius Dobzhansky, and George Gaylord Simpson, three of the architects of the modern synthesis—were extremely skeptical of molecular approaches, especially their connection (or lack thereof) to natural selection. The molecular-clock hypothesis and the neutral theory were particularly controversial, spawning the neutralist-selectionist debate over the relative importance of mutation, drift and selection, which continued into the 1980s without a clear resolution.

== Late 20th century ==
=== Gene-centered view ===
In the mid-1960s, George C. Williams strongly critiqued explanations of adaptations worded in terms of "survival of the species" (group selection arguments). Such explanations were largely replaced by a gene-centered view of evolution, epitomized by the kin selection arguments of W. D. Hamilton, George R. Price and John Maynard Smith. This viewpoint would be summarized and popularized in the influential 1976 book The Selfish Gene by Richard Dawkins. Models of the period seemed to show that group selection was severely limited in its strength; though newer models do admit the possibility of significant multi-level selection.

In 1973, Leigh Van Valen proposed the term "Red Queen," which he took from Through the Looking-Glass by Lewis Carroll, to describe a scenario where a species involved in evolutionary arms races would have to constantly change to keep pace with the species with which it was co-evolving. Hamilton, Williams and others suggested that this idea might explain the evolution of sexual reproduction: the increased genetic diversity caused by sexual reproduction would help maintain resistance against rapidly evolving parasites, thus making sexual reproduction common, despite the tremendous cost from the gene-centric point of view of a system where only half of an organism's genome is passed on during reproduction.

Contrary to the expectations of the Red Queen hypothesis, Hanley et al. found that the prevalence, abundance and mean intensity of mites was significantly higher in sexual geckos than in asexuals sharing the same habitat. Furthermore, Parker, after reviewing numerous genetic studies on plant disease resistance, failed to find a single example consistent with the concept that pathogens are the primary selective agent responsible for sexual reproduction in their host. At an even more fundamental level, Heng and Gorelick and Heng reviewed evidence that sex, rather than enhancing diversity, acts as a constraint on genetic diversity. They considered that sex acts as a coarse filter, weeding out major genetic changes, such as chromosomal rearrangements, but permitting minor variation, such as changes at the nucleotide or gene level (that are often neutral) to pass through the sexual sieve. The adaptive function of sex remains a major unresolved issue. The competing models to explain the adaptive function of sex were reviewed by Birdsell and Wills. A principal alternative view to the Red Queen hypothesis is that sex arose, and is maintained, as a process for repairing DNA damage, and that genetic variation is produced as a byproduct.

The gene-centric view has also led to an increased interest in Charles Darwin's idea of sexual selection, and more recently in topics such as sexual conflict and intragenomic conflict.

=== Sociobiology ===
W. D. Hamilton's work on kin selection contributed to the emergence of the discipline of sociobiology. The existence of altruistic behaviors has been a difficult problem for evolutionary theorists from the beginning. Significant progress was made in 1964 when Hamilton formulated the inequality in kin selection known as Hamilton's rule, which showed how eusociality in insects (the existence of sterile worker classes) and other examples of altruistic behavior could have evolved through kin selection. Other theories followed, some derived from game theory, such as reciprocal altruism. In 1975, E. O. Wilson published the influential and highly controversial book Sociobiology: The New Synthesis which claimed evolutionary theory could help explain many aspects of animal, including human, behavior. Critics of sociobiology, including Stephen Jay Gould and Richard Lewontin, claimed that sociobiology greatly overstated the degree to which complex human behaviors could be determined by genetic factors. They also claimed that the theories of sociobiologists often reflected their own ideological biases. Despite these criticisms, work has continued in sociobiology and the related discipline of evolutionary psychology, including work on other aspects of the altruism problem.

=== Evolutionary paths and processes ===
A phylogenetic tree showing the three-domain system. Eukaryotes are colored red, archaea green, and bacteria blue.

One of the most prominent debates arising during the 1970s was over the theory of punctuated equilibrium. Niles Eldredge and Stephen Jay Gould proposed that there was a pattern of fossil species that remained largely unchanged for long periods (what they termed stasis), interspersed with relatively brief periods of rapid change during speciation. Improvements in sequencing methods resulted in a large increase of sequenced genomes, allowing the testing and refining of evolutionary theories using this huge amount of genome data. Comparisons between these genomes provide insights into the molecular mechanisms of speciation and adaptation. These genomic analyses have produced fundamental changes in the understanding of evolutionary history, such as the proposal of the three-domain system by Carl Woese. Advances in computational hardware and software allow the testing and extrapolation of increasingly advanced evolutionary models and the development of the field of systems biology. One of the results has been an exchange of ideas between theories of biological evolution and the field of computer science known as evolutionary computation, which attempts to mimic biological evolution for the purpose of developing new computer algorithms. Discoveries in biotechnology now allow the modification of entire genomes, advancing evolutionary studies to the level where future experiments may involve the creation of entirely synthetic organisms.

=== Microbiology, horizontal gene transfer, and endosymbiosis ===
Microbiology was largely ignored by early evolutionary theory due to the paucity of morphological traits and the lack of a species concept in microbiology, particularly amongst prokaryotes. Now, evolutionary researchers are taking advantage of their improved understanding of microbial physiology and ecology, produced by the comparative ease of microbial genomics, to explore the taxonomy and evolution of these organisms. These studies are revealing unanticipated levels of diversity amongst microbes.

One important development in the study of microbial evolution came with the discovery in Japan in 1959 of horizontal gene transfer. This transfer of genetic material between different species of bacteria came to the attention of scientists because it played a major role in the spread of antibiotic resistance. More recently, as knowledge of genomes has continued to expand, it has been suggested that lateral transfer of genetic material has played an important role in the evolution of all organisms. These high levels of horizontal gene transfer have led to suggestions that the family tree of today's organisms, the so-called "tree of life," is more similar to an interconnected web.

The endosymbiotic theory for the origin of organelles sees a form of horizontal gene transfer as a critical step in the evolution of eukaryotes. The endosymbiotic theory holds that organelles within the cells of eukorytes such as mitochondria and chloroplasts had descended from independent bacteria that came to live symbiotically within other cells. It had been suggested in the late 19th century when similarities between mitochondria and bacteria were noted, but largely dismissed until it was revived and championed by Lynn Margulis in the 1960s and 1970s; Margulis was able to make use of new evidence that such organelles had their own DNA that was inherited independently from that in the cell's nucleus.

=== From spandrels to evolutionary developmental biology ===
In the 1980s and 1990s, the tenets of the modern evolutionary synthesis came under increasing scrutiny. There was a renewal of structuralist themes in evolutionary biology in the work of biologists such as Brian Goodwin and Stuart Kauffman, which incorporated ideas from cybernetics and systems theory, and emphasized the self-organizing processes of development as factors directing the course of evolution. The evolutionary biologist Stephen Jay Gould revived earlier ideas of heterochrony, alterations in the relative rates of developmental processes over the course of evolution, to account for the generation of novel forms, and, with the evolutionary biologist Richard Lewontin, wrote an influential paper in 1979 suggesting that a change in one biological structure, or even a structural novelty, could arise incidentally as an accidental result of selection on another structure, rather than through direct selection for that particular adaptation. They called such incidental structural changes "spandrels" after an architectural feature. Later, Gould and Elisabeth Vrba discussed the acquisition of new functions by novel structures arising in this fashion, calling them "exaptations."

Molecular data regarding the mechanisms underlying development accumulated rapidly during the 1980s and 1990s. It became clear that the diversity of animal morphology was not the result of different sets of proteins regulating the development of different animals, but from changes in the deployment of a small set of proteins common to all animals. These proteins became known as the "developmental-genetic toolkit." Such perspectives influenced the disciplines of phylogenetics, paleontology and comparative developmental biology, and spawned the new discipline of evolutionary developmental biology (evo-devo).

== 21st century ==
=== Macroevolution and microevolution ===
One of the tenets of population genetics is that macroevolution (the evolution of phylogenic clades at the species level and above) was solely the result of the mechanisms of microevolution (changes in gene frequency within populations) operating over an extended period of time. During the last decades of the 20th century some paleontologists raised questions about whether other factors, such as punctuated equilibrium and group selection operating on the level of entire species and even higher level phylogenic clades, needed to be considered to explain patterns in evolution revealed by statistical analysis of the fossil record. Some researchers in evolutionary developmental biology suggested that interactions between the environment and the developmental process might have been the source of some of the structural innovations seen in macroevolution, but other evo-devo researchers maintained that genetic mechanisms visible at the population level are fully sufficient to explain all macroevolution. Still others maintain that genetic mechanisms need to be complemented by the physical processes mobilized by the toolkit gene products to account for macroevolutionary transitions

=== Epigenetic inheritance ===
Epigenetics is the study of heritable changes in gene expression or cellular phenotype caused by mechanisms other than changes in the underlying DNA sequence. By the first decade of the 21st century it was accepted that epigenetic mechanisms were a necessary part of the evolutionary origin of cellular differentiation. Although epigenetics in multicellular organisms is generally thought to be involved in differentiation, with epigenetic patterns "reset" when organisms reproduce, there have been some observations of transgenerational epigenetic inheritance. This shows that in some cases nongenetic changes to an organism can be inherited; such inheritance may help with adaptation to local conditions and affect evolution. Some have suggested that in certain cases a form of Lamarckian evolution may occur.

=== Extended evolutionary syntheses ===
The idea of an extended evolutionary synthesis extends the 20th-century modern synthesis to include concepts and mechanisms such as multilevel selection theory, transgenerational epigenetic inheritance, niche construction and evolvability—though several different such syntheses have been proposed, with no agreement on what exactly would be included.

== Unconventional evolutionary theory ==
=== Omega Point ===
Pierre Teilhard de Chardin's metaphysical Omega Point theory, found in his book The Phenomenon of Man (1955), describes the gradual development of the universe from subatomic particles to human society, which he viewed as its final stage and goal, a form of orthogenesis.

=== Gaia hypothesis ===
The Gaia hypothesis proposed by James Lovelock holds that the living and nonliving parts of Earth can be viewed as a complex interacting system with similarities to a single organism. The Gaia hypothesis has also been viewed by Lynn Margulis and others as an extension of endosymbiosis and exosymbiosis. This modified hypothesis postulates that all living things have a regulatory effect on the Earth's environment that promotes life overall.

=== Self-organization ===
The mathematical biologist Stuart Kauffman suggested that self-organization may play roles alongside natural selection in three areas of evolutionary biology: population dynamics, molecular evolution, and morphogenesis. However, Kauffman does not take into account the essential role of energy in driving biochemical reactions in cells, as proposed by Christian de Duve and modelled mathematically by Richard Bagley and Walter Fontana. Their systems are self-catalyzing but not simply self-organizing as they are thermodynamically open systems relying on a continuous input of energy.

== See also ==
- Current research topics in evolutionary biology
- Darwinism
- Faith and rationality
- Galápagos Islands
- Genetic drift
- Objections to evolution
- Timeline of evolutionary history of life
- The Voyage of the Beagle

== Bibliography ==
- Aquinas, Thomas (1963). Commentary on Aristotle's Physics. Rare Masterpieces of Philosophy and Science. Translated by Richard J. Blackwell, Richard J. Spath, and W. Edmund Thirlkel. Introduction by Vernon J. Bourke. New Haven, CT: Yale University Press. LCCN 64000189. OCLC 555112.
- Augustine (1982). The Literal Meaning of Genesis. Ancient Christian Writers. Vol. 41. Translated and annotated by John Hammond Taylor. New York: Newman Press. ISBN 978-0-8091-0326-3. LCCN 82061742. OCLC 9264423.
- Bernstein, Harris; Bernstein, Carol; Michod, Richard E. (2012). "DNA Repair as the Primary Adaptive Function of Sex in Bacteria and Eukaryotes". In Kimura, Sakura; Shimizu, Sora (eds.). DNA Repair: New Research. DNA and RNA: Properties and Modifications, Functions and Interactions, Recombination and Applications; Cell Biology Research Progress. New York: Nova Science Publishers. ISBN 978-1-62100-808-8. LCCN 2011038504. OCLC 828424701.
- Bernstein, Harris; Hopf, Frederic A.; Michod, Richard E. (1987). "The Molecular Basis of the Evolution of Sex". In Scandalios, John G. (ed.). Molecular Genetics of Development. Advances in Genetics. Vol. 24. San Diego, CA: Academic Press. pp. 323–70. doi:10.1016/S0065-2660(08)60012-7. ISBN 978-0-12-017624-3. LCCN 47030313. OCLC 18561279. PMID 3324702.
- Birdsell, John A.; Wills, Christopher (2003). "The Evolutionary Origin and Maintenance of Sexual Recombination: A Review of Contemporary Models". In MacIntyre, Ross J.; Clegg, Michael T. (eds.). Evolutionary Biology. Vol. 33. New York: Kluwer Academic/Plenum Publishers. ISBN 978-0-306-47261-9. LCCN 67011961. OCLC 52628679.
- Bowler, Peter J. (2000) [Originally published 1992 in England as The Fontana History of the Environmental Sciences]. The Earth Encompassed: A History of the Environmental Sciences. Norton History of Science (1st American ed.). New York: W. W. Norton & Company. ISBN 978-0-393-32080-0. LCCN 00056625. OCLC 44493380.
- Bowler, Peter J. (2003). Evolution: The History of an Idea (3rd ed.). Berkeley, CA: University of California Press. ISBN 978-0-520-23693-6. LCCN 2002007569. OCLC 49824702.
- Bowler, Peter J.; Morus, Iwan Rhys (2005). Making Modern Science: A Historical Survey. Chicago, IL: University of Chicago Press. ISBN 978-0-226-06861-9. LCCN 2004019553. OCLC 56333962.
- Brockman, John (1995). The Third Culture: Beyond the Scientific Revolution. New York: Simon & Schuster. ISBN 978-0-684-80359-3. LCCN 95000083. OCLC 872061170.
- Darwin, Charles (1859). On the Origin of Species by Means of Natural Selection, or the Preservation of Favoured Races in the Struggle for Life (1st ed.). London: John Murray. LCCN 06017473. OCLC 741260650. The book is available from The Complete Work of Charles Darwin Online. Retrieved 2014-11-07.
- Darwin, Charles (1861). On the Origin of Species by Means of Natural Selection, or the Preservation of Favoured Races in the Struggle for Life (3rd ed.). London: John Murray. LCCN 04001284. OCLC 550913.
- Darwin, Charles (1866). On the Origin of Species by Means of Natural Selection, or the Preservation of Favoured Races in the Struggle for Life (4th ed.). London: John Murray. OCLC 44636697.
- Darwin, Charles (1872). The Origin of Species by Means of Natural Selection, or the Preservation of Favoured Races in the Struggle for Life (6th ed.). London: John Murray. OCLC 1185571.
- Darwin, Erasmus (1794–1796). Zoonomia; or, the Laws of Organic Life. London: Joseph Johnson. LCCN 34036671. OCLC 670735211.
- Darwin, Erasmus (1803). The Temple of Nature; or The Origin of Society: A Poem, with Philosophical Notes. London: Joseph Johnson. LCCN 18021459. OCLC 3182406.
- Darwin, Francis, ed. (1887). The Life and Letters of Charles Darwin. Vol. 1. London: John Murray. LCCN 13003390. OCLC 834491713.
- Desmond, Adrian; Moore, James (1991). Darwin. London; New York: Michael Joseph; Viking Penguin. ISBN 978-0-7181-3430-3. LCCN 92196964. OCLC 26502431.
- Eldredge, Niles; Gould, Stephen Jay (1972). "Punctuated Equilibria: An Alternative to Phyletic Gradualism" (PDF). In Schopf, Thomas J. M. (ed.). Models in Paleobiology. San Francisco, CA: Freeman, Cooper. ISBN 978-0-87735-325-6. LCCN 72078387. OCLC 572084.
  - Reprinted in Eldredge, Niles (1985). Time Frames: The Rethinking of Darwinian Evolution and the Theory of Punctuated Equilibria. New York: Simon & Schuster. ISBN 978-0-671-49555-8. LCCN 84023632. OCLC 11443805.
- Gill, Meredith J. (2005). Augustine in the Italian Renaissance: Art and Philosophy from Petrarch to Michelangelo. Cambridge; New York: Cambridge University Press. ISBN 978-0-521-83214-4. LCCN 2004055146. OCLC 65338721.
- Gould, Stephen Jay (1983). "The Hardening of the Modern Synthesis". In Grene, Marjorie (ed.). Dimensions of Darwinism: Themes and Counterthemes in Twentieth Century Evolutionary Theory. Cambridge; New York: Cambridge University Press. ISBN 978-0-521-25408-3. LCCN 83001795. OCLC 9197170.
- Gould, Stephen Jay (2000). The Lying Stones of Marrakech: Penultimate Reflections in Natural History. New York: Harmony Books. ISBN 978-0-609-60142-6. LCCN 99036148. OCLC 41606297.
- Gould, Stephen Jay (2002). The Structure of Evolutionary Theory. Cambridge, MA: Belknap Press of Harvard University Press. ISBN 978-0-674-00613-3. LCCN 2001043556. OCLC 47869352.
- Greggs, Tom (2009). Barth, Origen, and Universal Salvation: Restoring Particularity. Oxford: Oxford University Press. ISBN 978-0-19-956048-6. LCCN 2009926743. OCLC 804502782.
- Gregory, Andrew (2017). Anaximander: A Re-assessment. New York; London: Bloomsbury Academic. ISBN 978-1-4725-0892-8. LCCN 2015031535. OCLC 932488714.
- Haeckel, Ernst (1879). The Evolution of Man: A Popular Exposition of the Principal Points of Human Ontogeny and Phylogeny. Vol. 2. From the German of Ernst Haeckel. New York: D. Appleton & Company. LCCN 15007537. OCLC 2855202. Volumes 1 and 2 of the book is available from the Biodiversity Heritage Library. Retrieved 2014-11-16.
- Henderson, Jan-Andrew (2000). The Emperor's Kilt: The Two Secret Histories of Scotland. Edinburgh: Mainstream Publishing. ISBN 978-1-84018-378-8. LCCN 00456815. OCLC 45991266.
- Harris, C. Leon (1981). Evolution: Genesis and Revelations: With Readings from Empedocles to Wilson. Albany, NY: State University of New York Press. ISBN 978-0-87395-487-7. LCCN 81002555. OCLC 1053000064.
- Huxley, Thomas Henry (September 23, 1876). "Evidences of Evolution—III: Prof. Huxley's Closing Lecture in New-York". Prof. Huxley in America (Extra). New York: New-York Tribune. OCLC 21657981.
- Ibn Khaldūn (1967). Dawood, N. J. (ed.). The Muqaddimah: An Introduction to History. Bollingen Series. Translation by Franz Rosenthal (2nd ed.). Princeton, NJ: Princeton University Press. ISBN 978-0-691-09797-8. LCCN 74186373. OCLC 614847005.
- Johnston, Ian C. (1999). . . . And Still We Evolve: A Handbook for the Early History of Modern Science (Third revised ed.). Nanaimo, British Columbia: Liberal Studies Department, Malaspina University College. Archived from the original on 2016-04-16.
- Kauffman, Stuart A. (1993). The Origins of Order: Self-organization and Selection in Evolution. New York: Oxford University Press. ISBN 978-0-19-507951-7.
- Kirk, Geoffrey S.; Raven, John E.; Schofield, Malcolm (1983). The Presocratic Philosophers: A Critical History with a Selection of Texts (2nd ed.). Cambridge; New York: Cambridge University Press. ISBN 978-0-521-27455-5. LCCN 82023505. OCLC 9081712.
- Kiros, Teodros, ed. (2001). Explorations in African Political Thought: Identity, Community, Ethics. New Political Science Reader Series. Preface by K. Anthony Appiah. New York: Routledge. ISBN 978-0-415-92766-6. LCCN 00032313. OCLC 43913197.
- Krebs, Robert E. (2004). Groundbreaking Scientific Experiments, Inventions, and Discoveries of the Middle Ages and the Renaissance. Groundbreaking Scientific Experiments, Inventions and Discoveries through the Ages. Westport, CT; London: Greenwood Press. ISBN 978-0-313-32433-8. LCCN 2003060075. OCLC 474228676.
- Larson, Edward J. (2004). Evolution: The Remarkable History of a Scientific Theory. New York: Modern Library. ISBN 978-0-679-64288-6. LCCN 2003064888. OCLC 53483597.
- Layton, Richard A. (2004). Didymus the Blind and His Circle in Late-antique Alexandria: Virtue and Narrative in Biblical Scholarship. Urbana, IL: University of Illinois Press. ISBN 978-0-252-02881-6. LCCN 2003007685. OCLC 52031419.
- Lovejoy, Arthur O. (1936). The Great Chain of Being: A Study of the History of an Idea. William James Lectures, 1933. Cambridge, MA: Harvard University Press. ISBN 978-0-674-36153-9. LCCN 36014264. OCLC 192226.
- Mathez, Edmond A., ed. (2001). Earth: Inside and Out. American Museum of Natural History Book. New York: New Press. ISBN 978-1-56584-595-4. LCCN 00136454. OCLC 45386398.
- Mayr, Ernst (1982). The Growth of Biological Thought: Diversity, Evolution, and Inheritance. Cambridge, MA: Belknap Press. ISBN 978-0-674-36445-5. LCCN 81013204. OCLC 7875904.
- Mayr, Ernst (1988). Toward a New Philosophy of Biology: Observations of an Evolutionist. Cambridge, MA: Belknap Press of Harvard University Press. ISBN 978-0-674-89665-9. LCCN 87031892. OCLC 17108004.
- Mayr, Ernst; Provine, William B., eds. (1998). The Evolutionary Synthesis: Perspectives on the Unification of Biology. New preface by Ernst Mayr. Cambridge, MA: Harvard University Press. ISBN 978-0-674-27226-2. LCCN 98157613. OCLC 503188713.
- Osborn, Henry Fairfield (1905) [Originally published 1894]. From the Greeks to Darwin: An Outline of the Development of the Evolution Idea. Columbia Biological Series (2nd ed.). New York: Macmillan and Co. LCCN 04005633. OCLC 6921487.
- Osborn, Henry Fairfield (1917). The Origin and Evolution of Life: On the Theory of Action, Reaction and Interaction of Energy. Hale Lectures of the National Academy of Sciences, Washington, April, 1916. New York: Charles Scribner's Sons. LCCN 17025802. OCLC 2992426.
- Owen, Richard (1861). Palæontology, or a Systematic Summary of Extinct Animals and Their Geological Relations (2nd ed.). Edinburgh: Adam and Charles Black. LCCN agr07001574. OCLC 13383944. The book is available from the HathiTrust Digital Library. Retrieved 2014-11-16.
- Pallen, Mark J. (2009). The Rough Guide to Evolution. Rough Guides Reference Guides. London; New York: Rough Guides. ISBN 978-1-85828-946-5. LCCN 2009288090. OCLC 258100820.
- Powell, Jeffrey R. (1994). "Molecular techniques in population genetics: A brief history". In Schierwater, B.; Streit, B.; Wagner, G. P.; DeSalle, R. (eds.). Molecular Ecology and Evolution: Approaches and Applications. Basel; Boston: Birkhäuser. ISBN 978-3-7643-2942-6. LCCN 94018022. OCLC 30436574.
- Ronan, Colin A. (1995) [Originally published 1980]. The Shorter Science and Civilisation in China: An Abridgement by Colin A. Ronan of Joseph Needham's Original Text. Vol. 1. Cambridge; New York: Cambridge University Press. ISBN 978-0-521-29286-3. LCCN 77082513. OCLC 3345021.
- Russell, E.S. (1916). Form and Function: A Contribution to the History of Animal Morphology. London: John Murray. LCCN 17015690. OCLC 5295266.
  - Owen, Richard (1848). On the Archetype and Homologies of the Vertebrate Skeleton. London: John Van Voorst. OCLC 8185253.
- Sapp, Jan (2003). Genesis: The Evolution of Biology. Oxford; New York: Oxford University Press. ISBN 978-0-19-515618-8. LCCN 2002152271. OCLC 62869613.
- Schelling, Friedrich Wilhelm Joseph (1978). System of transcendental idealism (1800). Translated by Peter Heath. Introduction by Michael Vater. Charlottesville, VA: University Press of Virginia. ISBN 978-0-8139-0780-2. LCCN 78006638. OCLC 3844212.
- Secord, James A. (2000). Victorian Sensation: The Extraordinary Publication, Reception, and Secret Authorship of Vestiges of the Natural History of Creation. Chicago, IL: University of Chicago Press. ISBN 978-0-226-74410-0. LCCN 00009124. OCLC 43864195.
- Singer, Charles (1931). A Short History of Biology. Oxford: Clarendon Press. LCCN 31014507. OCLC 1197036.
- Smocovitis, Vassiliki Betty (1996). Unifying Biology: The Evolutionary Synthesis and Evolutionary Biology. Princeton, NJ: Princeton University Press. ISBN 978-0-691-03343-3. LCCN 96005605. OCLC 34411399.
- Stearns, Stephen C.; Hoekstra, Rolf F. (2000). Evolution: An Introduction. London; New York: Oxford University Press. ISBN 978-0-19-854968-0. LCCN 00267695. OCLC 44932786.
- Teilhard de Chardin, Pierre (1959) [Originally published 1955; Paris: Éditions du Seuil]. Le phénomène humain [The Phenomenon of Man]. Introduction by Julian Huxley; translation by Bernard Wall. New York: Harper & Brothers. LCCN 59005154. OCLC 285906.
- White, Andrew Dickson (1922) [Originally published 1896]. A History of the Warfare of Science with Theology in Christendom. Vol. 1. New York; London: D. Appleton & Company. LCCN 09020218. OCLC 780151083. The book is available from Project Gutenberg. Retrieved 2014-11-11.
