= What Darwin Didn't Know =

Documentary on BBC Four

- Genre: Documentary
- Presented by: Armand Marie Leroi
- Country of origin: United Kingdom

Production
- Running time: 90 mins

Original release
- Network: BBC Four
- Release: 26 January 2009 – 15 April 2010

What Darwin Didn't Know is a documentary show on BBC Four presented by Armand Marie Leroi which charts the progress in the field of evolutionary theory since the original publication of Charles Darwin's On the Origin of Species in 1859.

The theory of evolution by natural selection is now orthodoxy, but when it was unveiled it caused a storm of controversy, from fellow scientists as well as religious people. They criticised it for being short on evidence and long on assertion and Darwin, being the honest scientist that he was, agreed with them. He knew that his theory was riddled with "difficulties", but he entrusted future generations to complete his work and prove the essential truth of his vision, which is what scientists have been doing for the past 150 years.

The evolutionary biologist Professor Armand Marie Leroi charts the scientific endeavour that brought about the triumphant renaissance of Darwin's theory. He argues that, with the new science of evolutionary developmental biology (evo devo), it may be possible to take that theory to a new level – to do more than explain what has evolved in the past, and start to predict what might evolve in the future.
