= T. orientalis =

T. orientalis may refer to:

- Tasiocera orientalis, a crane fly species in the genus Tasiocera
- Thenus orientalis, the Moreton Bay bug or Bay lobster, a slipper lobster species found throughout the waters of Australia's north coast
- Thunnus orientalis, the Pacific bluefin tuna, a fish species found in the Pacific Ocean
- Timia orientalis, a picture-winged fly species
- Tipula orientalis, a crane fly species in the genus Tipula
- Toussaintia orientalis, a plant species endemic to Tanzania and Kenya
- Trachystemon orientalis, the Abraham-Isaac-Jacob, a perennial herb species native to eastern Europe
- Tragopogon orientalis, a plant species in the genus Tragopogon
- Trema orientalis, the pigeon wood, gunpowder tree or nalita, a flowering tree species found from South Africa to Tropical Africa and in warm regions of Asia
- Triplophysa orientalis, a ray-finned fish species
- Typha orientalis, the raupo, a wetland plant species in the genus Typha

== Synonyms ==
- Tapiostola orientalis, a synonym for Hypocoena inquinata, the sordid wainscot or tufted sedge moth, a moth species found across Canada from Newfoundland to British Columbia, south in the east to Connecticut and Ohio and in the west to Colorado
- Thuja orientalis, a synonym for Platycladus orientalis, a conifer tree species

== See also ==
- Orientalis (disambiguation)
