= Salsify =

Salsify may refer to:

- Tragopogon, a plant genus
- Tragopogon porrifolius (purple/common salsify), a plant with linear leaves cultivated for its light-skinned edible root and herbal properties
- Pseudopodospermum hispanicum (black salsify), a plant with lanceolate leaves cultivated for its dark-skinned edible root
- Scorzonera judaica (formerly called salsify)
