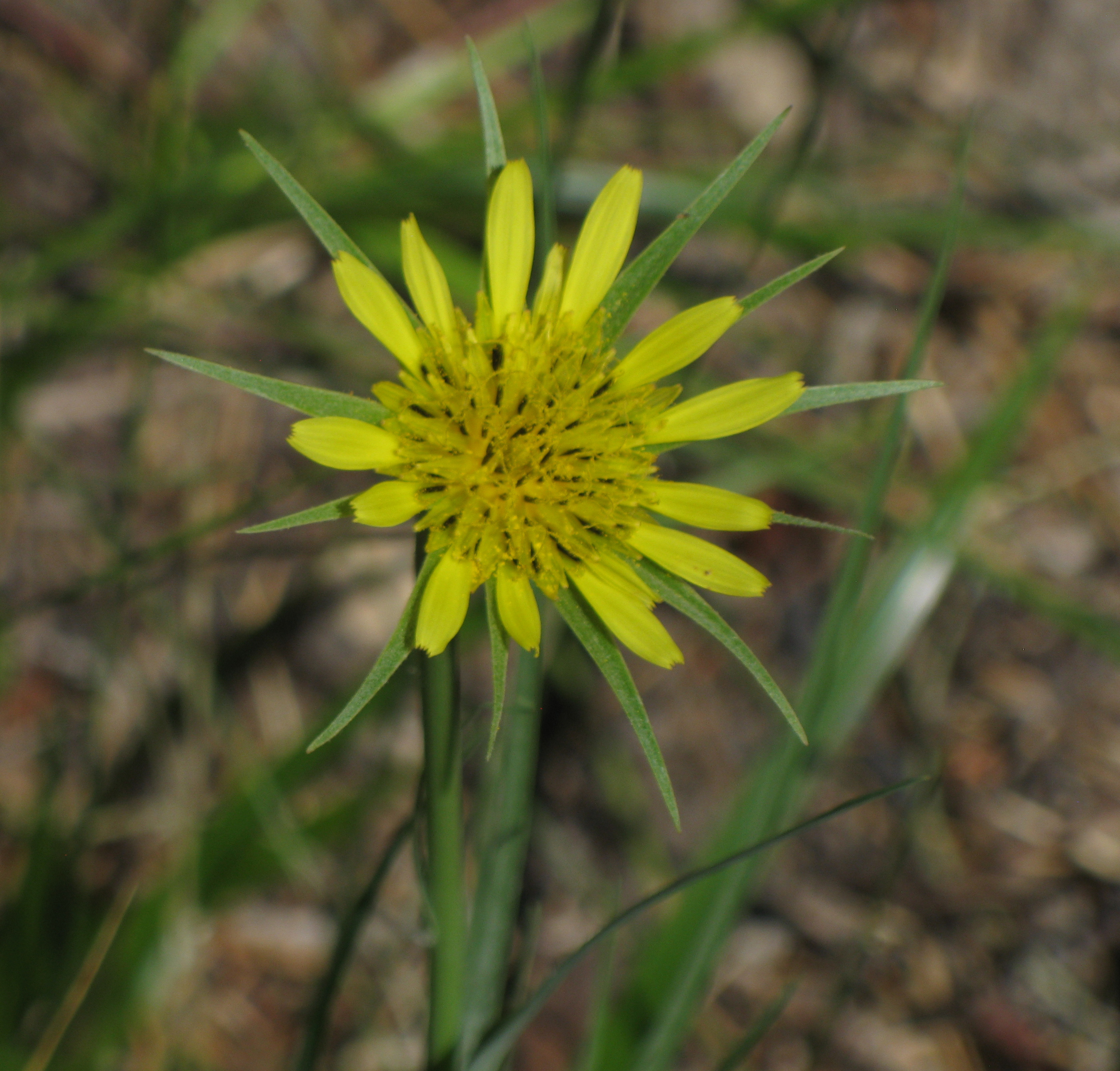

Scientific classification
- Kingdom: Plantae
- Clade: Tracheophytes
- Clade: Angiosperms
- Clade: Eudicots
- Clade: Asterids
- Order: Asterales
- Family: Asteraceae
- Genus: Tragopogon
- Species: T. dubius

Binomial name
- Tragopogon dubius Scop.

Synonyms
- Tragopogon major subsp. dubius (Scop.) Nyman; Tragopogon pratensis subsp. dubius (Scop.) Gaut.

= Tragopogon dubius =

Species of plant

Tragopogon dubius, commonly known as yellow salsify, is a species of salsify with yellow flower heads. It is native to Eurasia and has been introduced to North America.

== Description ==
Like most salsifies, Tragopogon dubius grows as an annual or occasionally biennial forb, reaching a height of 40–80 centimetres (15 1/2–31 1/2 in). The leaves are up to 25 cm (10 in) long.

The buds are blue-green, tall, and tapered. On display from late spring to late summer, the yellow flower head is 4–5 cm (1 1/2–2 in) wide. The inflorescence opens early in the morning and often closes up by late afternoon. Later, the plant forms a seed head resembling that of dandelions, but distinctly larger.

The seeds (known as achenes) are 2–4 cm long but featherweight, weighing about 8 mg each on average. There is some natural variation between the central and peripheral achenes in the seedhead, with the peripheral ones being generally darker and heavier, and having a higher concentration of phenolic compounds; this may enhance their survival potential.

=== Similar species ===
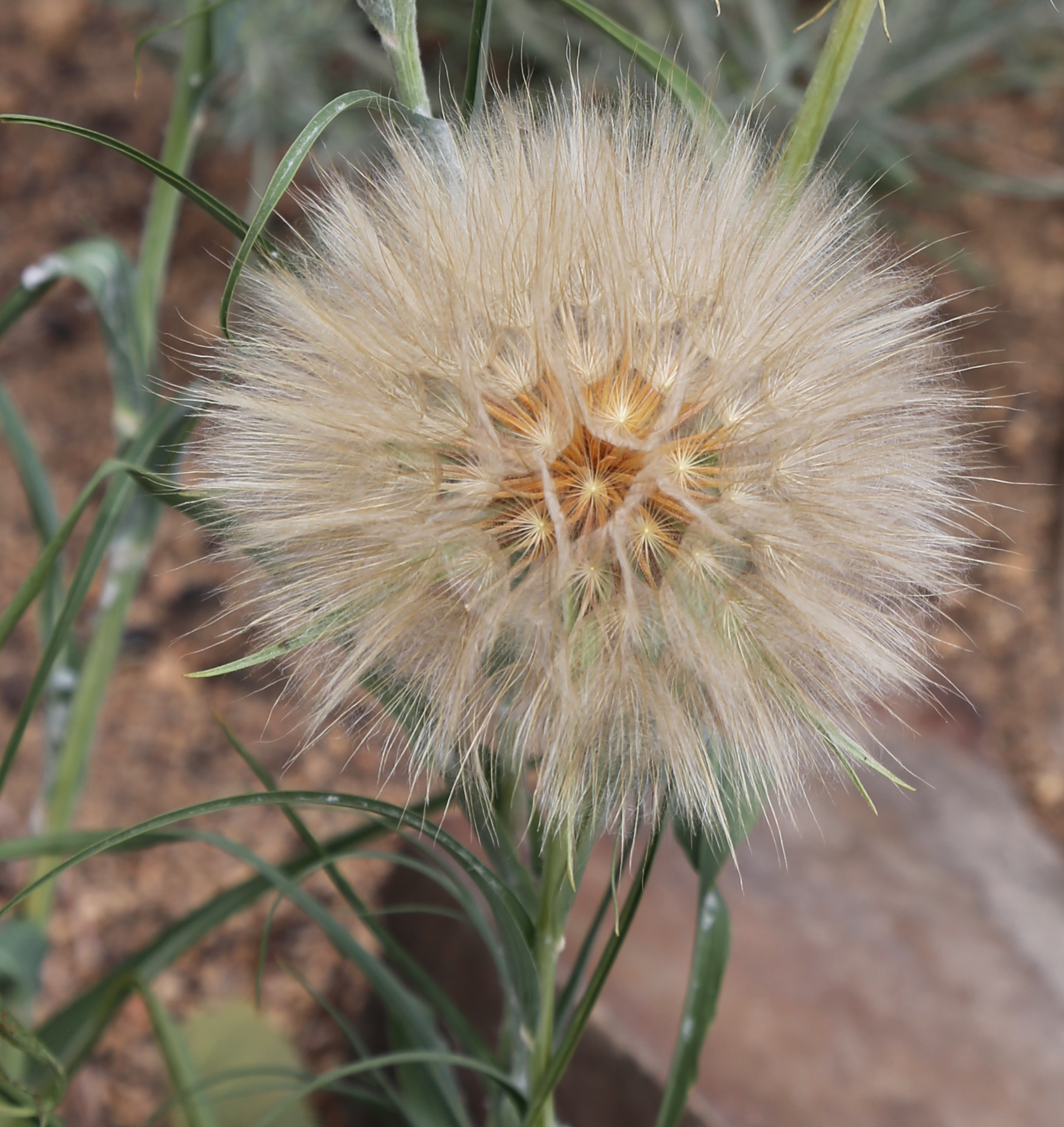
T. dubius, large seedhead

Similar species include the widespread T. pratensis (meadow salsify), the bracts of which are shorter than the rays.

== Taxonomy ==
Although not particularly closely related to T. porrifolius or T. pratensis, T. dubius hybridises readily with both, and in North America its hybrids have given rise to the new alloploid hybrid species T. mirus and T. miscellus.

=== Names ===
It has a synonym, Tragopogon major.

Its common names include yellow salsify, western salsify, western goat's-beard, wild oysterplant, yellow goat's beard, meadow goat's beard, goat's beard (or goatsbeard), common salsify, and salsify. Some of these are also, perhaps more commonly, used for other species.

== Distribution and habitat ==
It is native to southern and central Europe and western Asia and found as far north and west as northern France. Although it has been reported from Kashmir and India, recent evidence suggests that specimens from these areas may be a different species.

It has been introduced into North America where it has become widespread, being reported from all the continental United States except for a few in the far southeast, and all provinces of Canada except Newfoundland and the northern territories.

It grows typically in fields and disturbed areas.

== Uses ==
The edibility of wild western salsify is disputed. In The Medicinal and Poisonous Plants of Southern and Eastern Africa (1962) by Watt and Breyer-Brandwijk it is reported to be inedible. However, Stephen Facciola wrote in his book Cornucopia (1990) that the flowering stems, buds, leaves, shoots, and roots are all edible.

Though purple salsify (Tragopogon porrifolus) is also called oyster root, both western salsify and meadow salsify (Tragopogon pratensis) have roots that are much more strongly flavored, but that are both fibrous and bitter. Garden grown roots of all species are more easily eaten than wild harvested roots.

The edibility of yellow salsify as discussed above referencing James Duke's book may have used information on purple salsify. Referencing Watt and Breyer-Brandwijk's book on the Internet Archives, they do not refer to the YELLOW variety, but to Tragopogon porrifolius L. the cultivated PURPLE salsify which grows as an escape in some parts of South Africa. The cultivated root is edible but the wild variety is inedible. From Australia it is reported that the young wild plant is eaten by cattle but not when it is in flower. In Europe the root has been used as an aperitif and as an expectorant and the stalk as a vegetable. In the United States of America the plant has been found to contain about 0-1 per cent of rubber.

Referencing Facciola's book on the Internet Archives they do not refer to the YELLOW variety, but to the PURPLE Tragopogon porrifolius L.. Salsify, Oyster plant, Vegetable oyster. Roots are eaten raw in salads, boiled, baked, sauteed in butter, added to soups, or grated and made into cakes. The young shoots (chards), flower buds, and flowers may be eaten in salads, either raw or cooked and cooled. Flowers are also pickled. Young flower-stalks are cooked and dressed like asparagus. Sprouted seeds can be used in salads and sandwiches. The milky latex from the roots was used as chewing gum by British Columbia Indians.

Neither Watt and Breyer-Brandwijk nor Facciola discuss Tragopogon dubius.
