= Senecio eboracensis =

Scientific classification
- Kingdom: Plantae
- Clade: Tracheophytes
- Clade: Angiosperms
- Clade: Eudicots
- Clade: Asterids
- Order: Asterales
- Family: Asteraceae
- Genus: Senecio
- Species: S. eboracensis

Binomial name
- Senecio eboracensis Abbott & Lowe
- Range of Senecio eboracensis in Great Britain.

Species of flowering plant in the daisy family

Senecio eboracensis, the York groundsel or York radiate groundsel, is a flowering plant in the daisy family Asteraceae. It is a hybrid between a native and a non-native introduced species, which naturalised in England but the population failed to sustain itself. It was brought back by captive cultivation. It is a self-pollinating hybrid species of ragwort and one of only six new plant species to be discovered in either the United Kingdom or North America in the last 100 years.

The plant was first discovered in York, England, in 1979 and last seen in the wild in 1991. A survey by UK government advisory body Natural England found it was driven to extinction by 2000, partly due to the use of weedkiller. Seeds of the plant were stored at the Millennium Seed Bank, successfully germinated, and reintroduced to York in 2023.

== Description ==
York radiate groundsel is an annual herbaceous plant that sets its seed within the 3 months that it takes this plant to mature from germination to the upwards of 16 inches (41 cm) high adult plant. With yellow daisy-like flowers from its Sicilian parent (S. squalidus) but also with the less-promiscuous habits of its native parent (S. vulgaris), this member of the genus Senecio is morphologically distinct from related species.

Leaf shapes of S. eboracensis

Leaves and stems

S. eboracensis have large many lobed leaves divided into slender segments, the clefts not reaching the midrib. The stems are mostly erect to ascending with an occasional horizontal base section up to 2 inches (5 cm) with 'adventitious roots' at base. The upper and lower leaves petiolate and lobes appearing at quarter whole leaf lengths along the midrib. The upper leaves are generally more deeply lobed and in lobed pairs. Leaves on plants grown in fertile soils or in greenhouses can be much more luxurious and more highly dissected (or more finely divided into slender segments) up to 7 inches (18 cm) x 3.5 inches (9 cm) with lobes appearing at fifth whole leaf lengths along the midrib. Leaf edges throughout are dentate or sometimes divided into lobes.

Flowers

York groundsel has flower-heads that are more showy than those of its parent groundsel. The flower-head, found at the tips of the plants (apical) appearing in clusters (an inflorescence) usually consist of three to seven florets grouped in a corymb; at first dense and leafy but eventually less dense with peduncles 5 to 20 millimeters (0.2 to 0.8 in) which get longer when fruiting (up to 25 mm (1 in)). The flower-head is broadly cylindrical 10×4 millimeters (0.4×0.16 in), becoming slightly bell shaped) when the bright yellow ray florets open. Involucral bracts sparse (4-8), elongated (3.5–4 mm), usually without black tips. The ligules are narrow, 5 to 7 millimeters (0.2 to 0.24 in) long and 1.5 millimeters (0.06 in) wide), occasionally becoming revolute.

Seeds

The achenes can be 2.5 to 3.5 millimeters (0.1 to 0.15 in) long, are straight and shallowly grooved. The smooth ribs are hairless while the grooves are covered with hairs. The silky white, umbrella-like pappus readily detaches from the fruit when ripe.

== Name ==
The word Eboracum, the classical name of York, was chosen in the year 2000 to describe this tetraploid hybrid derivative informally named 'York radiate groundsel' at the time a formal description was made.

== Distribution ==
York groundsel occurs on disturbed ground, car park perimeters, pavement cracks and other urban/industrial sites; specifically in disturbed areas near to the railways in York, England. One of the parents Senecio vulgaris is a native to the area while the other parent Senecio squalidus was introduced from Mount Etna in Sicily in 1690 to the Oxford Botanic Garden in England, and was soon spreading along the railways and throughout the country.

It became near-extinct by the 1990s probably due to the use of weed-killing chemicals and ground disturbance. A programme of reintroduction in York resulted in flowering plants in 2023 and a sustainable population of several thousand plants.

== Evolution ==
Senecio eboracensis is a hybrid species whose parents are the self-incompatible and promiscuous Sicilian Senecio squalidus (also known as Oxford ragwort) and the self-compatible and tenacious Senecio vulgaris (also known as Common groundsel). Like S. vulgaris, S. eboracensis is self-compatible but shows little or no natural crossing with its parent species and is therefore reproductively isolated, indicating that strong breeding barriers exist between this new hybrid and its parents. It is thought to have resulted from backcrossing of the F1 hybrid of its parents to S. vulgaris. S. vulgaris is native to Britain, while S. squalidus was introduced from Sicily in the early 18th century; therefore, S. eboracensis has speciated from those two species within the last 300 years.

Other hybrids descended from the same two parents are known. Some are infertile, such as S. x baxteri. Other fertile hybrids are also known, including S. vulgaris var. hibernicus (which has been accepted as a synonym for S. vulgaris), now common in Britain, and the allohexaploid S. cambrensis, which according to molecular evidence probably originated independently at least three times in different locations. Morphological and genetic evidence support the status of S. eboracensis as separate from other known hybrids.

== See also ==
- Common Cordgrass
- De-extinction
- Welsh groundsel
- Tragopogon miscellus
- Tragopogon mirus
- Judean date palm
- Raphanus sativus x Brassica rapa
