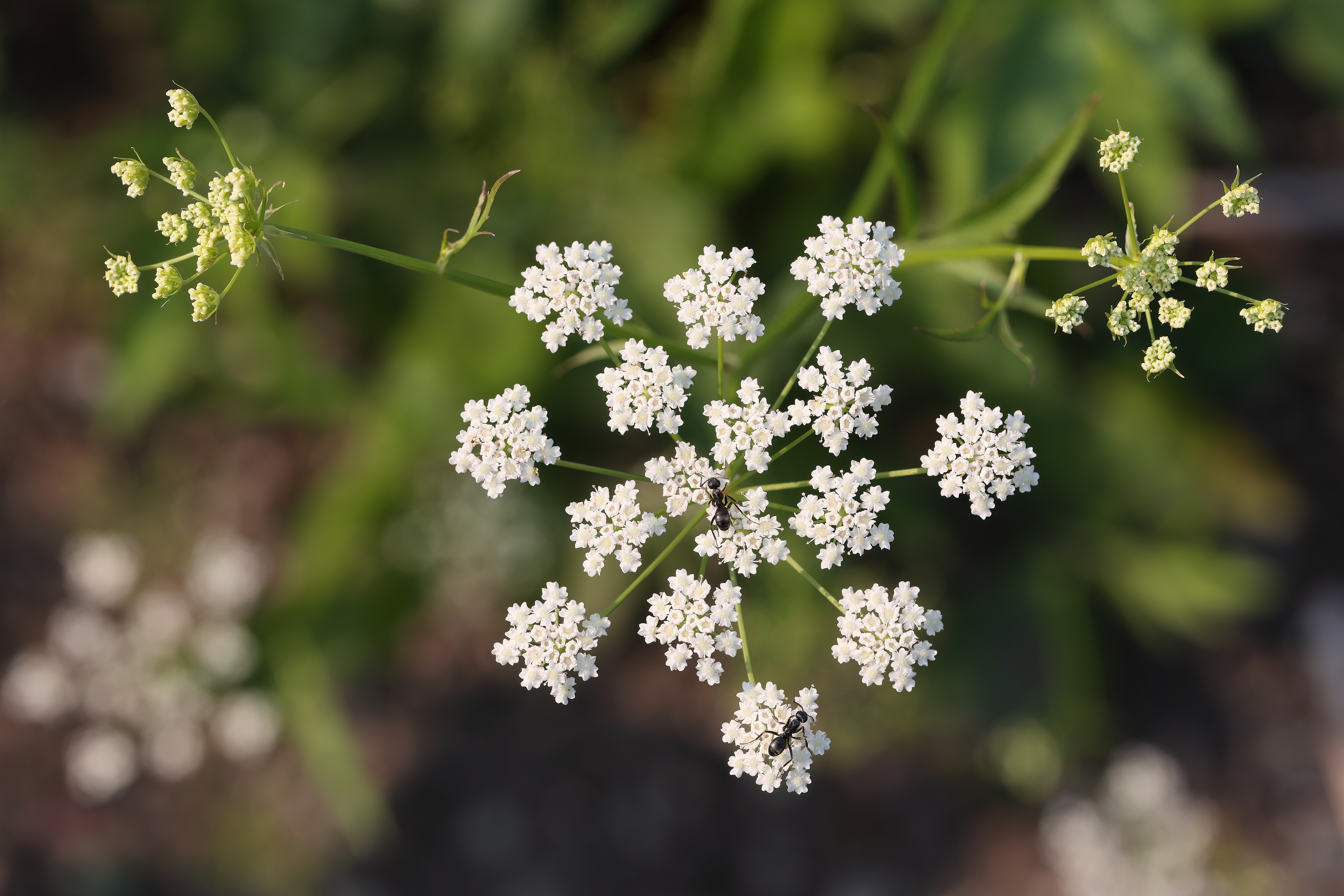

Scientific classification
- Kingdom: Plantae
- Clade: Tracheophytes
- Clade: Angiosperms
- Clade: Eudicots
- Clade: Asterids
- Order: Apiales
- Family: Apiaceae
- Genus: Sium
- Species: S. sisarum

Binomial name
- Sium sisarum L.

= Sium sisarum =

Species of flowering plant

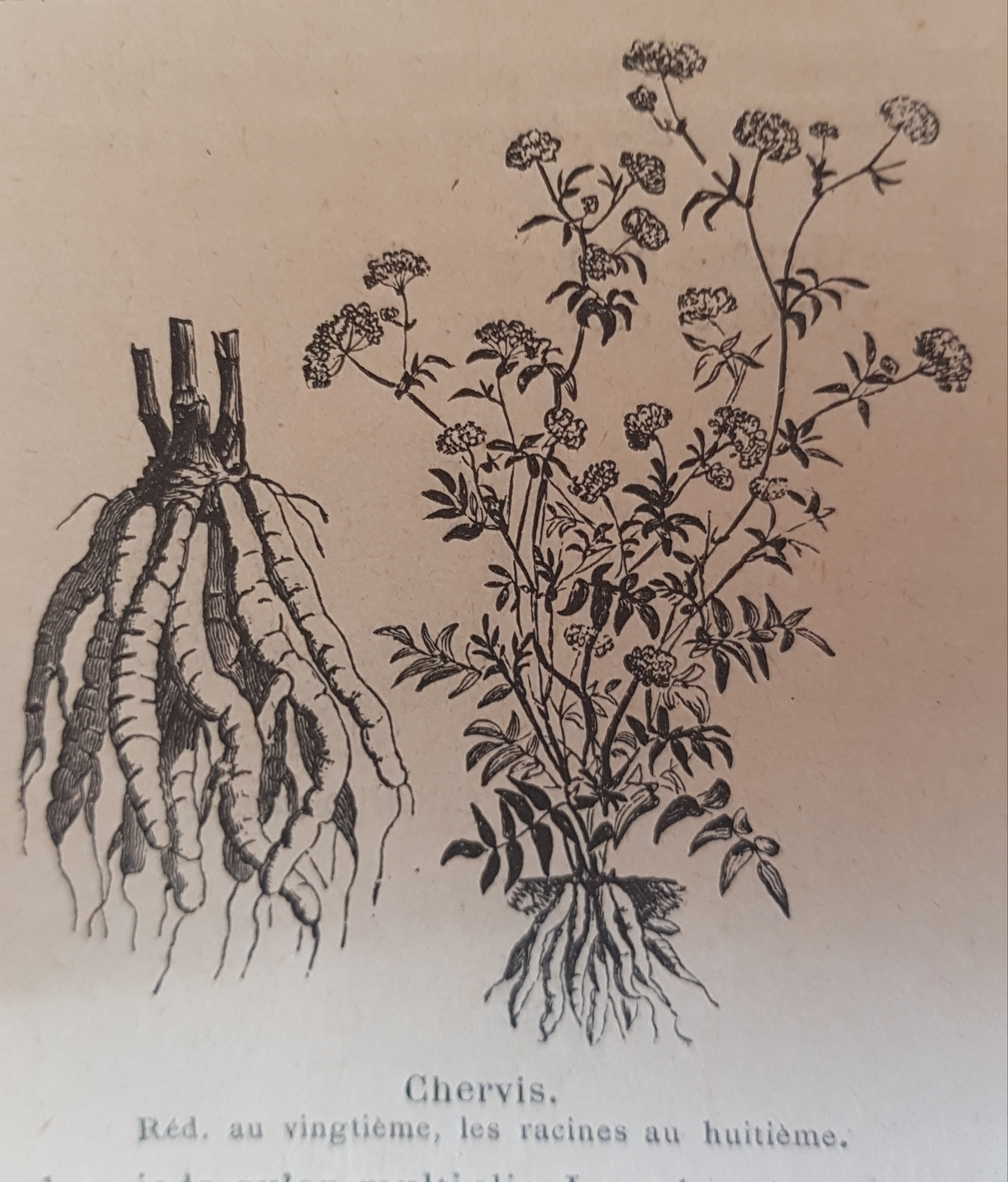
Roots and plant of chervil (Sium sisarum) in "Les plantes potagères" Vilmorin-Andrieux 1925

Sium sisarum, commonly known as skirret, is a perennial plant of the family Apiaceae in the same family as carrots and parsnip. Skirret is grown as a root vegetable. The English name skirret is derived from the Middle English 'skirwhit' or 'skirwort', meaning 'white root'. In Scots it is known as crummock and in Irish as sciréad. Its Danish name sukkerrod, Dutch name suikerwortel and German name "Zuckerwurzel" translate as 'sugar root'.

Skirret has a cluster of bright white, sweetish, somewhat aromatic roots, each approximately 15–20 centimetres (6–8 in) in length. These are used as a vegetable in the same manner as the common salsify, black salsify and the parsnip.

== History ==
The plant's first known description is siser mentioned by Pliny the Elder as a favourite of the Emperor Tiberius, though this may have also been a reference to a parsnip or carrot.

The twelfth-century Benedictine abbess Hildegard von Bingen discussed the medicinal properties of skirret in her work Physica:

Skirret (gerla) is hot and dry. Eaten in moderation, it is not very helpful or harmful. If someone should eat a lot of it, its heat and dryness would stir up fevers in him and harm his intestines. A person whose face has weak skin, which easily splits, should pound skirret in a mortar and add oil. When he goes to bed at night, he should rub it on his face, continuing until he is healed.

A 1390 manuscript The Forme of Cury used by King Richard II of England's master cooks included two recipes for fritters that included 'skyrwates'.

Cookery books in the 14th century instruct cooks to fry skirrets in oil or butter.

Maud Grieve in A Modern Herbal mentions that it has been cultivated in Great Britain since 1548 and is supposed to be a useful diet in chest complaints. The seventeenth-century English herbalist Nicholas Culpeper said about the plant:

Sisari, secacul. Of Scirrets. They are hot and moist, of good nourishment, something windy, as all roots are; by reason of which, they provoke venery, they stir up appetite, and provoke urine.

John Gerard's Herball or General Historie of Plantes of 1633 describes skirret thus:

Sisarum. Skirrets. The roots of the Skirret be moderately hot and moist; they be easily concocted; they nourish meanly, and yeeld a reasonable good iuice: but they are something windie, by reason whereof they also prouoke lust. They be eaten boiled, with vineger, salt, and a little oile, after the manner of a sallad, and oftentimes they be fried in oile and butter, and also dressed after other fashions, according to the skill of the cooke, and the taste of the eater...

When boiled and served with butter, the roots form a dish, declared by the seventeenth-century agriculturist John Worlidge in 1682, to be "the sweetest, whitest, and most pleasant of roots".

== Cultivation ==
Skirret grows about 1 m (40 in) high and is very resistant to cold, as well as pests and diseases. It can be grown from seeds, but may also be started from root divisions. The roots are best eaten when the plant is dormant during the winter, as in the spring, the roots become woody and covered with small hairs. Lack of moisture can also make the root more fibrous. The plant prefers sandy and moist soil.

== Culinary use ==
The roots are scrubbed, cut into lengths, boiled, and served like parsnips or carrots. Skirret roots can be stewed, baked, roasted, fried in batter as fritter, or creamed, and also be grated and used raw in salads. A woody core may be present in some roots, though this seems to be variable in different plants. If present, it should be removed before cooking because it is difficult to remove after.
