= Tragopogon mirus =

Species of plant

Tragopogon mirus, the remarkable goatsbeard, is a plant species native to certain regions of North America. It is a weed with purple flowers that originated as a cross between two other Tragopogon species. It is notable for being an allotetraploid that occurred naturally due to this hybridization event.

Remarkable Goatsbeard (Tragopogon mirus)

== Description ==
Tragopogon mirus is classified as an herb, but is also commonly accepted to be a weed. It grows up to 150+ cm, and is characterized by straight leaves, short outer florets, and purple or brownish-purple flower heads that are yellow in the center, reminiscent of an eye.

Because T. mirus is a cross between Tragopogon dubius and Tragopogon porrifolius, it shares certain vegetative and floral characteristics with Tragopogon miscellus, a cross between Tragopogon dubius and Tragopogon pratensis. However they can be differentiated because unlike T. mirus, T. miscellus has solid yellow flowers, with no purple or brown hues, and leaves with recurved tips.

== Origin ==
T. mirus first originated just under a century ago in North America in the Palouse region, which includes southwestern parts of Washington state and the neighboring eastern regions of Idaho. Individual populations of T. mirus have formed at least thirteen times, resulting from crosses of T. dubius and T. porrifolius brought to the region in the early 20th century from Europe. Native populations have been found in Oregon, Washington, Idaho, Montana, and northern Arizona, and the species has also been introduced to the Ontario province in Canada.

== Polyploidy ==
Polyploidy is when the cells in an organism have multiple sets of chromosomes as a result of doubling of the same set (autopolypoidy) or a combination of two distinct sets (alloployploidy). It is found very commonly in plants and is a frequent driving mechanism of sympatric speciation. The speciation of T. mirus is a result of polyploidy.

T. mirus is an allopolyploid because its genome is a combination from of the genetic information of two distinct species, T. dubius and T. porrifolius. This hybridization event occurred naturally, making it an excellent model organism for investigating allopolyploidy and evolutionary systems. Additionally, T. mirus is also a tetraploid, because it has two sets of chromosomes from each diploid parent, resulting in four sets of chromosomes (24 total chromosomes as opposed to 12 found in T. dubius and T. porrifolius). This makes T. mirus an allotetraploid.

== Taxonomy ==
Tragopogon mirus Scientific Classification
Kingdom	Plantae
Subkingdom	Tracheobionta
Superdivision	Spermatophyta
Division	Magnoliophyta
Class	Magnoliopsida
Subclass	Asteridae
Order	Asterales
Family	Asteraceae
Genus	Tragopogon
Species	Tragopogon mirus
