= Dioscorea zingiberensis =

Scientific classification
- Kingdom: Plantae
- Clade: Tracheophytes
- Clade: Angiosperms
- Clade: Monocots
- Order: Dioscoreales
- Family: Dioscoreaceae
- Genus: Dioscorea
- Species: D. zingiberensis

Binomial name
- Dioscorea zingiberensis C.H. Wright

Synonyms
- Dioscorea henryi Uline ex Diels

Species of yam

Dioscorea zingiberensis, is a species of yam, a tuberous root vegetable. It has been cultivated in China for the production of diosgenin, an important pharmaceutical intermediate for the synthesis of steroid hormones. The rhizomes also produces steroidal saponins (TSS) as part of a treatment for cardiovascular disease.
