= Tyrella =

Tyrella Tigh Riala
- Civil parish
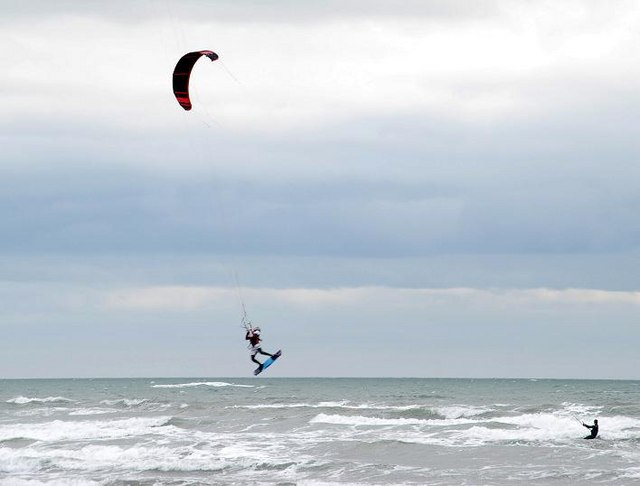
- Kite surfer taking to the air at Tyrella beach
- Etymology: From the Irish Tigh Riala, meaning "(Saint) Riail’s (monastic) house"
- Location within Northern Ireland Tyrella (island of Ireland)
- Coordinates: 54.256966°N 5.779459°W
- Country: United Kingdom
- Constituent country: Northern Ireland
- County: County Down
- Barony: Lecale Upper
- Time zone: UTC+0 (GMT)
  - Summer (DST): UTC+1 (BST)
- Postcode: BT30
- Dialing code: 028

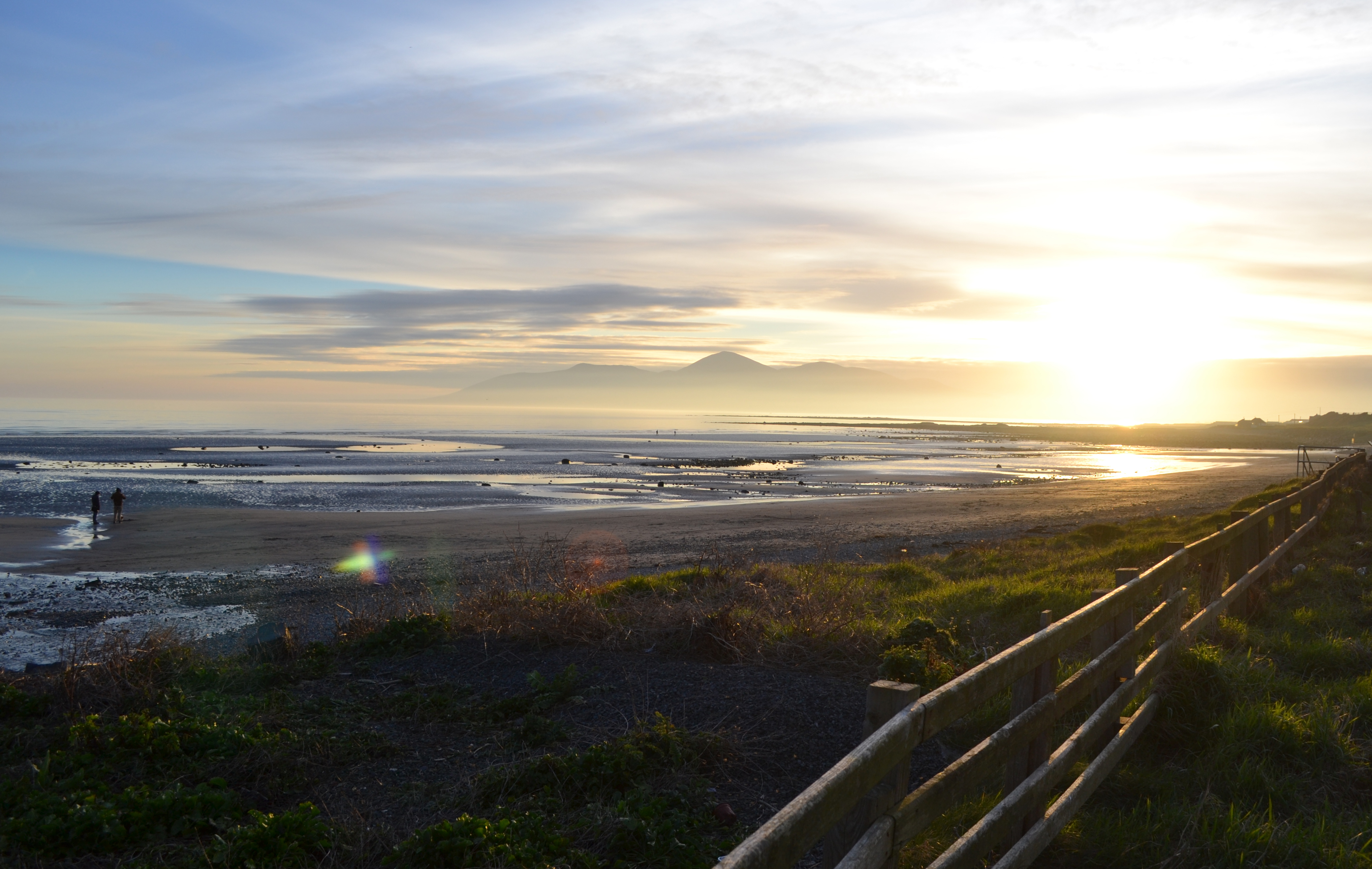
Looking across Tyrella beach toward the Mourne Mountains

Tyrella (from Irish Tigh Riala, meaning '(Saint) Riail’s (monastic) house') is a civil parish in County Down, Northern Ireland. It is situated in the historic barony of Lecale Upper.

== Tyrella Beach ==
Tyrella Beach is located in Dundrum Bay, near Downpatrick in County Down. It is a flat, sandy beach approximately two kilometres in length. Behind the beach lies a 25-hectare area of mature sand dunes, which form part of a designated conservation area. The site is known for its natural landscape and offers views of the nearby Mourne Mountains.

== Environmental Designations and Awards ==
The beach and surrounding area are designated as an Area of Special Scientific Interest (ASSI) due to their intertidal sand and rock communities, sand dune systems, and associated flora and fauna. Tyrella Beach has also received several environmental awards, including the Blue Flag Award annually since 2011, the Seaside Award since 1997, and the Green Coast Award since 2008. These awards reflect high standards in water quality, beach cleanliness, safety, and environmental stewardship. The Marine Conservation Society recommends the beach’s waters as safe for bathing.

== Ecology ==
The shoreline at Tyrella consists of a linear beach extending for several kilometres. The lower shore is composed of damp, fine sand, while the mid and upper shore areas contain medium, shelly sand. The intertidal zone is dominated by burrowing worms, particularly the lugworm. Patches of shingle vegetation are scattered along the upper shore, including species such as yellow horned-poppy and oysterplant. The presence of oysterplant is notable, as it represents one of the species’ most southerly locations in Britain and Ireland.

Behind the upper shore lies a sand dune system with a range of dune types. These include small, frontal embryo dunes that often reform each spring following winter storm damage, and older, more stable grey dunes that are now isolated from sources of wind-blown sand. Between these lies a narrow band of mobile white dunes. The embryo and white dunes support communities of sand couch grass and marram grass. These transition into species-rich grey dunes, where marram is accompanied by herbs such as cat’s-ear, common restharrow, lady’s bedstraw, wild thyme, kidney vetch, and bulbous buttercup. Several orchid species are present, including bee orchid and pyramidal orchid, while damper hollows support early marsh-orchid and variegated horsetail.

The area is also important for marine biodiversity. The honeycomb worm, which constructs sand grain tubes forming biogenic reefs, is found between boulders in the middle shore. These reefs enhance habitat diversity. The site is also used by common seals, which utilise offshore rocks and outcrops as haul-out and pupping sites.

== Facilities and Regulations ==
Tyrella Beach provides a range of public amenities, including off-beach parking, basic public toilets, and baby changing facilities. The beach is designated as a car-free zone. During the bathing season, dogs are not permitted on the beach between 10:00 AM and 6:00 PM. Lifeguards are on duty daily throughout July and August to ensure visitor safety.

== Recreational Activities ==
The beach is a popular destination for water-based recreation. Activities include kite surfing, surfing, windsurfing, and fishing. A 2.6-kilometre out-and-back trail near the beach is used for hiking, running, and walking. The trail is considered easy and typically takes about 30 minutes to complete.

== Sand Dune Conservation ==
The sand dunes at Tyrella Beach have experienced erosion due to weather conditions and high visitor numbers. In response, a conservation project was initiated to stabilise the dunes. Measures include restricting access to vulnerable areas and replanting native grasses with deep root systems that help bind the sand. These grasses, cultivated from local seed sources, are adapted to the coastal environment and play a key role in dune preservation. The project is supported by volunteers and aims to ensure the long-term stability of the dune system and surrounding landscape.

== Nearby Landmarks ==
Close to the beach is Tyrella House, a historic estate featuring architectural styles ranging from Regency to Art Deco. The property includes a private beach, a polo ground, and an equestrian centre. The estate hosts polo tournaments and is surrounded by beech trees, offering views of Dundrum Bay and the surrounding countryside.

The ancient parish church was located near Tyrella House, on the site now occupied by the 19th century Church of Ireland. It was named 'Tigh Riala (The house of Riail)' after its founder, an early christian saint who lived sometime before the 6th century.

== Townlands ==
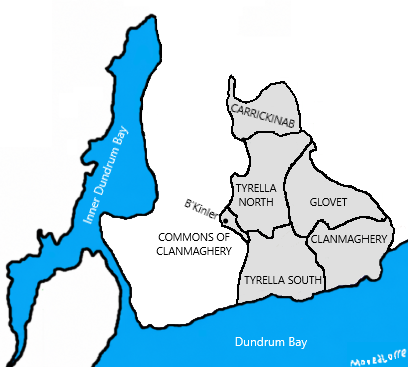
A map of Tyrella civil parish

Tyrella civil parish contains the following townlands:

Townland	Irish Name	Tanslation	Area (acres)	Brief History	Notes
Carrickinab	Ceathrú Mhic an Aba	‘MacNabb’s quarter(land)’	267.44	The name Carrickinab is recorded as early as 1618 and was originally derived from the Irish word for "quarter".	The name refers to the MacNabb clan, a Scottish family with branches that settled in Ulster.
Clanmaghery	Clár Machaire	‘flat place of the plain’	400.76	Derived from *clár* ‘level surface’ and *machaire* ‘plain’. Earlier forms misinterpreted the first element.	The modern form may reflect dissimilation or reinterpretation.
Commons of Clanmaghery		‘commons of Clanmaghery’	36.67	Named from English *commons* + Clanmaghery.	Refers to shared, uncultivated land; includes part of Ballykinlar army base.
Glovet	Glamhaid	‘bare place’	443.40	Possibly from *glamh*, a variant of *clamh* meaning ‘bare in spots’.	The name may refer to the land’s appearance.
Tyrella North	Tigh Riala Thuaidh	‘(Saint) Riail’s house (North)’	422.53	Named after a monastic site dedicated to Saint Riail; formerly known as Islandnamuck.	The name evolved through historical shifts in usage and parish naming.
Tyrella South	Tigh Riala Theas	‘(Saint) Riail’s house (South)’	Unknown	Named after a monastic site dedicated to Saint Riail; formerly known as Tyrella.	Site of the original church that gave the parish its name.

== See also ==
- List of civil parishes of County Down
