= Oyster plant =

Oyster plant is a common name used for various flowering plants, including:

- Acanthus mollis, (also called bear's breeches), native to the Mediterranean
- Mertensia maritima (also called oysterleaf), native to Europe and North America with leaves said to taste like oysters
- Pseudopodospermum hispanicum (also called black salsify), cultivated for its dark-skinned edible root
- Tragopogon porrifolius (also called purple salsify), cultivated for its light-skinned edible root
- Tradescantia spathacea (synonyms Tradescantia discolor, Rhoeo spathacea, Rhoeo discolor); (also called Oyster Herb, Daun Kepah, Nanas Kerang, Boatlily (Cây Lẻ Bạn, Lảo Bạn, Sò Huyết), Moses in a basket, Cradle Lily, Moses in His Cradle, Moses on a Raft, Moses in the Bulrushes, Men in a Boat, Moses-in-Cradle, (Chinese) 蚌花)
