= Backcrossing =

Crossing of a hybrid with one of its parents or a genetically similar individual

Backcrossing is a crossing of a hybrid with one of its parents or an individual genetically similar to its parent, to achieve offspring with a genetic identity closer to that of the parent. It is used in horticulture, animal breeding, and production of gene knockout organisms.

Backcrossed hybrids are sometimes described with acronym "BC"; for example, an F1 hybrid crossed with one of its parents (or a genetically similar individual) can be termed a BC1 hybrid, and a further cross of the BC1 hybrid to the same parent (or a genetically similar individual) produces a BC2 hybrid.

== Plants ==
=== Advantages ===
- If the recurrent parent is an elite genotype, at the end of the backcrossing programme, an elite genotype is recovered.
- As no "new" recombination results, the elite combination is not lost.

=== Disadvantages ===
- It works poorly for quantitative traits.
- It is more restricted for recessive traits.
- In practice, sections of genome from the nonrecurrent parents are often still present and can have unwanted traits associated with them.
- For very wide crosses, limited recombination may maintain thousands of "alien" genes within the elite cultivar.
- Many backcrosses are required to produce a new cultivar, which can take many years.

=== Natural backcrossings ===
York radiate groundsel (Senecio eboracensis) is a naturally occurring hybrid species of Oxford ragwort (Senecio squalidus) and common groundsel (Senecio vulgaris). It is thought to have arisen from a backcrossing of the F1 hybrid with S. vulgaris.

Again, the pure tall (TT) and pure dwarf (tt) pea plants when crossed in the parental generation, produce all heterozygote (Tt) tall pea plants in the first filial generation. The cross between first filial heterozygote tall (Tt) pea plant and pure tall (TT) or pure dwarf (tt) pea plant of the parental generation is also an example for the back-crossing between two plants. In this case, the filial generation formed after the back cross may have a phenotype ratio of 1:1 if the cross is made with recessive parent or else all offspring may be having phenotype of dominant trait if the backcross is with a parent having the dominant trait. The former of these traits is also called a test cross.

=== Artificially recombinant lines ===
In plants, the term inbred backcross line (IBL) refers to a line (i.e. population) of plants derived from the repeated backcrossing of a line with artificially recombinant DNA with the wild type, operating some kind of selection that can be phenotypical or through a molecular marker (for the production of an introgression line).

== Animals ==
This image demonstrates backcrossing of a heterozygous mouse from one genetic background onto another genetic background. In this example, the gene knockout is performed on 129/Sv cells and then backcrossed into the C57B/6J genetic background. With each successive backcross, the percentage of C57B/6J DNA that constitutes the genome of the offspring is increased.

Backcrossing may be deliberately employed in animals to transfer a desirable trait in an animal of inferior genetic background to an animal of preferable genetic background. In gene-knockout experiments in particular, where the knockout is performed on easily cultured stem cell lines, but is required in an animal with a different genetic background, the knockout animal is backcrossed against the animal of the required genetic background. As the figure shows, each time that the mouse with the desired trait (in this case the lack of a gene (i.e. a knockout), indicated by the presence of a positive selectable marker) is crossed with a mouse of a constant genetic background, the average percentage of the genetic material of the offspring that is derived from that constant background increases. The result, after sufficient reiterations, is an animal with the desired trait in the desired genetic background, with the percentage of genetic material from the original stem cells reduced to a minimum (on the order of 0.01%).

Due to the nature of meiosis, in which chromosomes derived from each parent are randomly shuffled and assigned to each nascent gamete, the percentage of genetic material deriving from either cell line varies between offspring of a single crossing, but will have an expected value. The genotype of each member of offspring may be assessed to choose not only an individual that carries the desired genetic trait, but also the minimum percentage of genetic material from the original stem cell line.

A consomic strain is an inbred strain with one of its chromosomes replaced by the homologous chromosome of another inbred strain via a series of marker-assisted backcrosses.

== See also ==
- Introgression
- Incest
