= Root vegetable =

Plant roots used as a vegetable

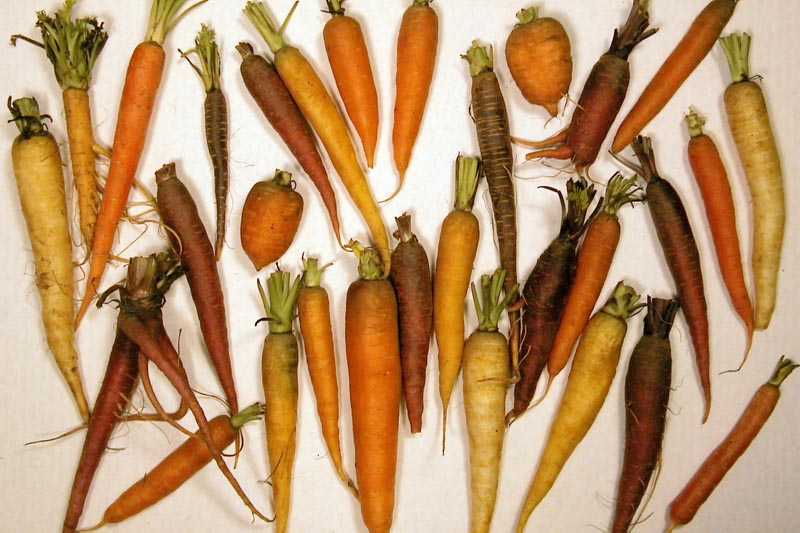
Carrot roots come in various shapes and colors

Root vegetables are underground plant parts eaten by humans and other animals as food. In agricultural and culinary terminology, the term applies to true roots, such as taproots and root tubers, as well as non-roots such as bulbs, corms, rhizomes, and stem tubers.

== Description ==
Root vegetables are generally energy storage organs containing carbohydrates such as starches and sugars.

== List of root vegetables ==
The following list classifies root vegetables organized by their roots' anatomy.

=== Modified plant stem ===
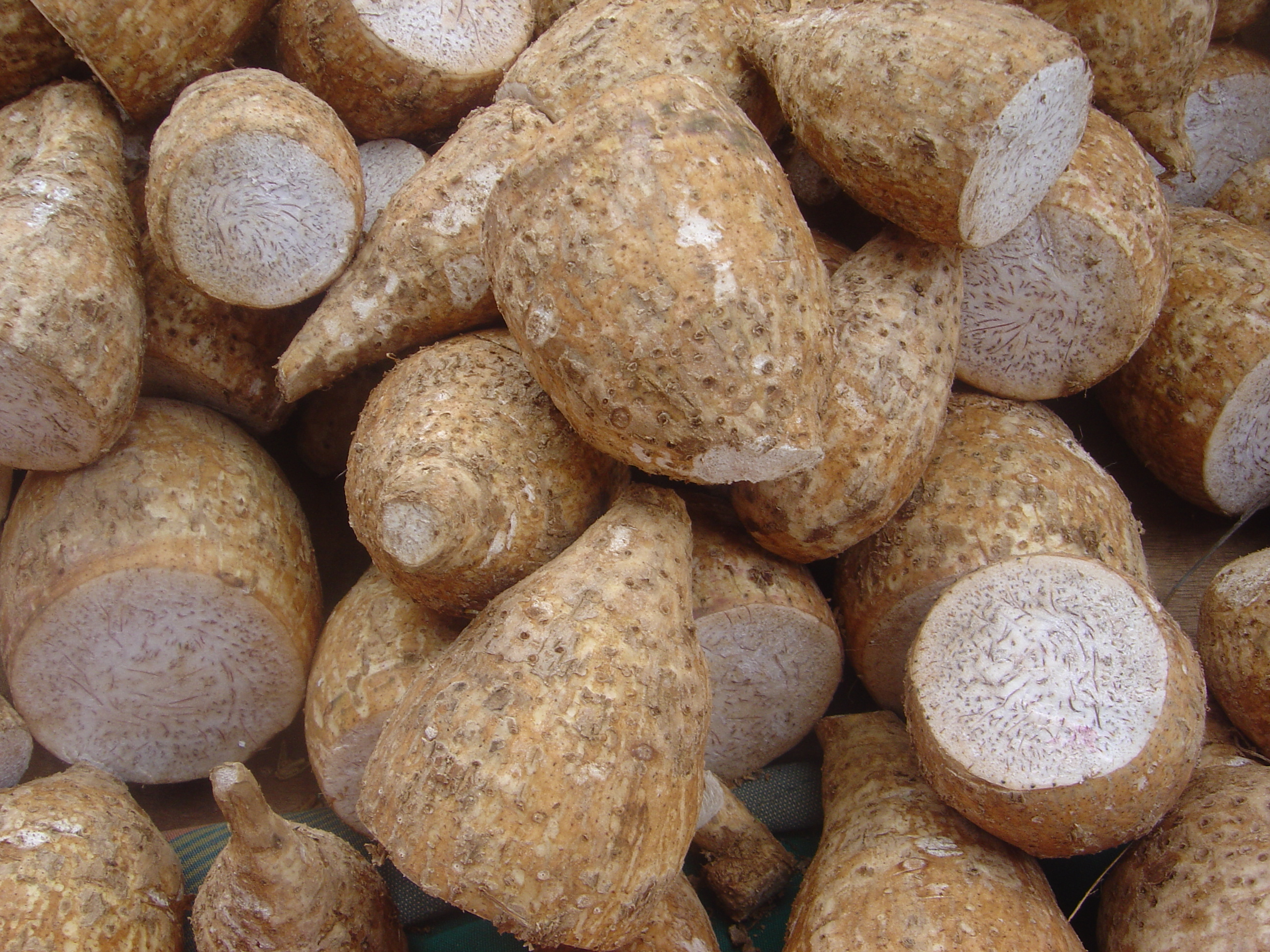
Taro corms

- Corm
  - Amorphophallus konjac (konjac)
  - Colocasia esculenta (taro)
  - Eleocharis dulcis (Chinese water chestnut)
  - Ensete spp. (enset)
  - Nymphaea spp. (waterlily)
  - Pteridium esculentum
  - Sagittaria spp. (arrowhead or wapato)
  - Typha spp.
  - Xanthosoma spp. (malanga, cocoyam, tannia, yautia and other names)
  - Colocasia antiquorum (eddoe or Japanese potato)

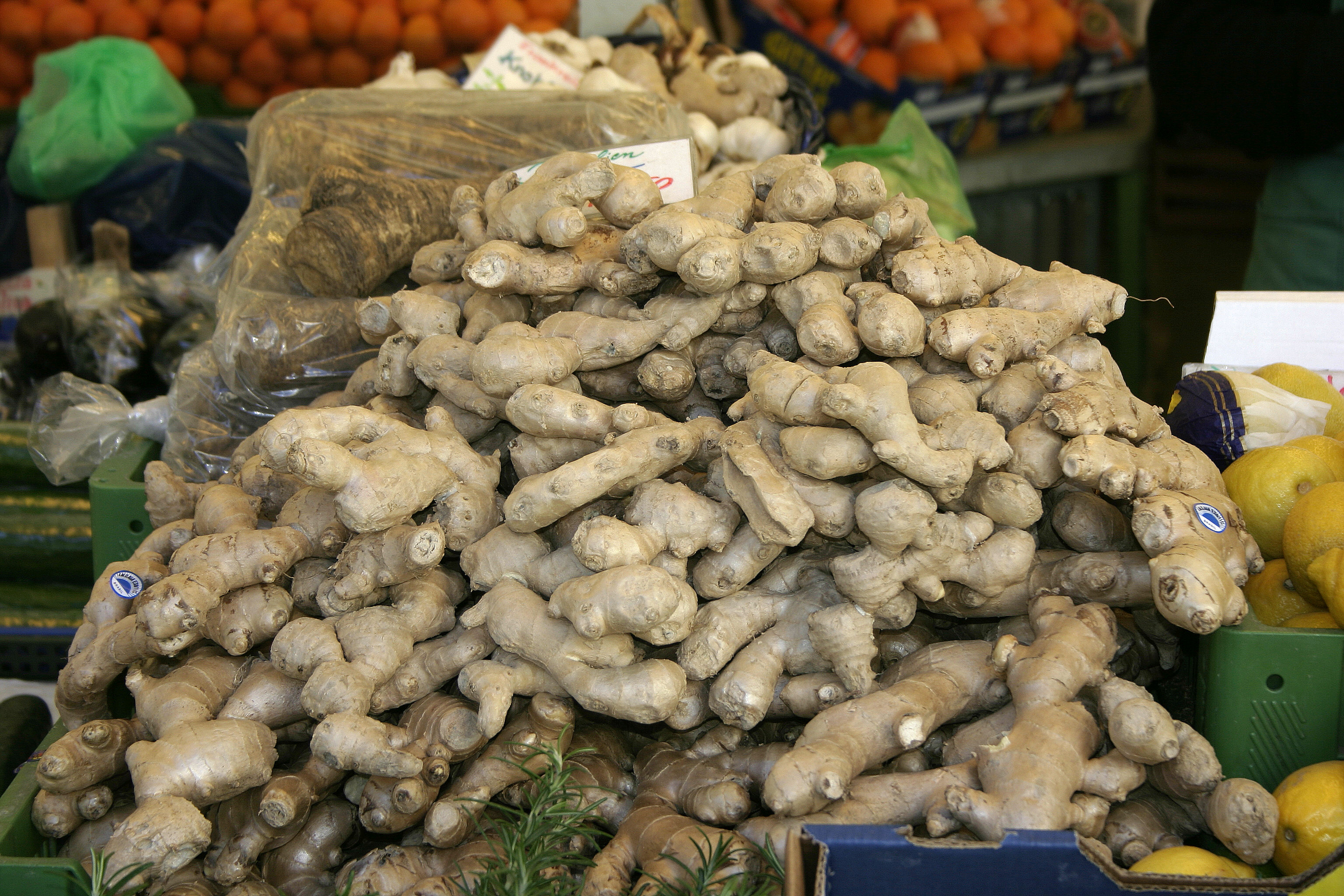
Ginger rhizomes

- Bulb
  - Allium cepa (onion)
  - Allium sativum (garlic)
  - Camassia quamash (blue camas)
  - Foeniculum vulgare (fennel)
- Rhizome
  - Alpinia galanga (galangal)
  - Arthropodium spp. (rengarenga, vanilla lily, and others)
  - Canna spp. (canna)
  - Cordyline fruticosa (ti)
  - Curcuma longa (turmeric)
  - Maranta arundinacea (arrowroot)
  - Nelumbo nucifera (lotus root)
  - Panax ginseng (ginseng)
  - Typha spp. (cattail or bulrush)
  - Zingiber officinale (ginger)

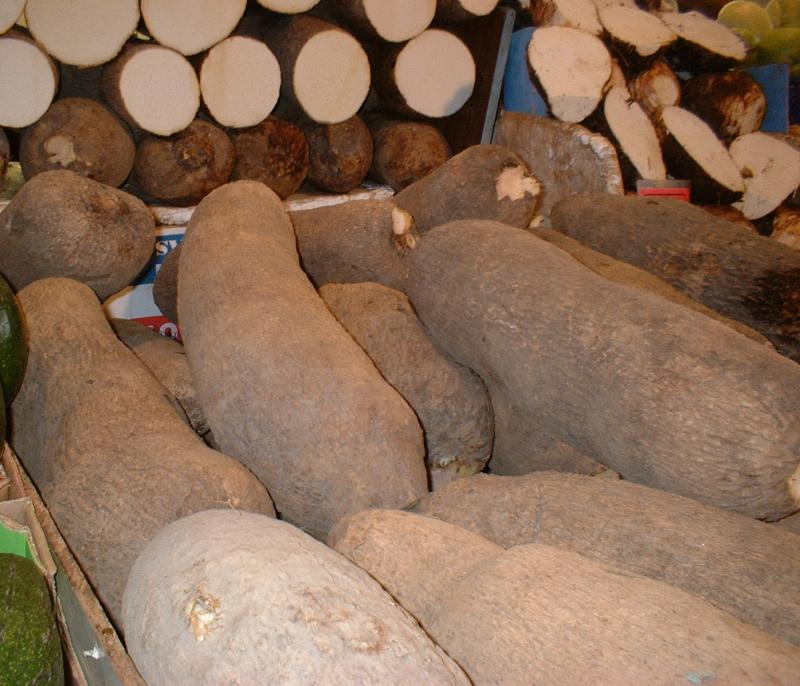
Yam tubers

- Tuberous stem
  - Apios americana (hog potato or groundnut)
  - Cyperus esculentus (tigernut or chufa)
  - Helianthus tuberosus (Jerusalem artichoke or sunchoke)
  - Hemerocallis spp. (daylily)
  - Lathyrus tuberosus (earthnut pea)
  - Oxalis tuberosa (oca or New Zealand yam)
  - Plectranthus edulis and P. esculentus (kembili, dazo, and others)
  - Solanum tuberosum (potato)
  - Stachys affinis (Chinese artichoke or crosne)
  - Tropaeolum tuberosum (mashua or añu)
  - Ullucus tuberosus (ulluku)

=== Root-like stem ===
- Zamia integrifolia (Florida arrowroot)

=== True root ===
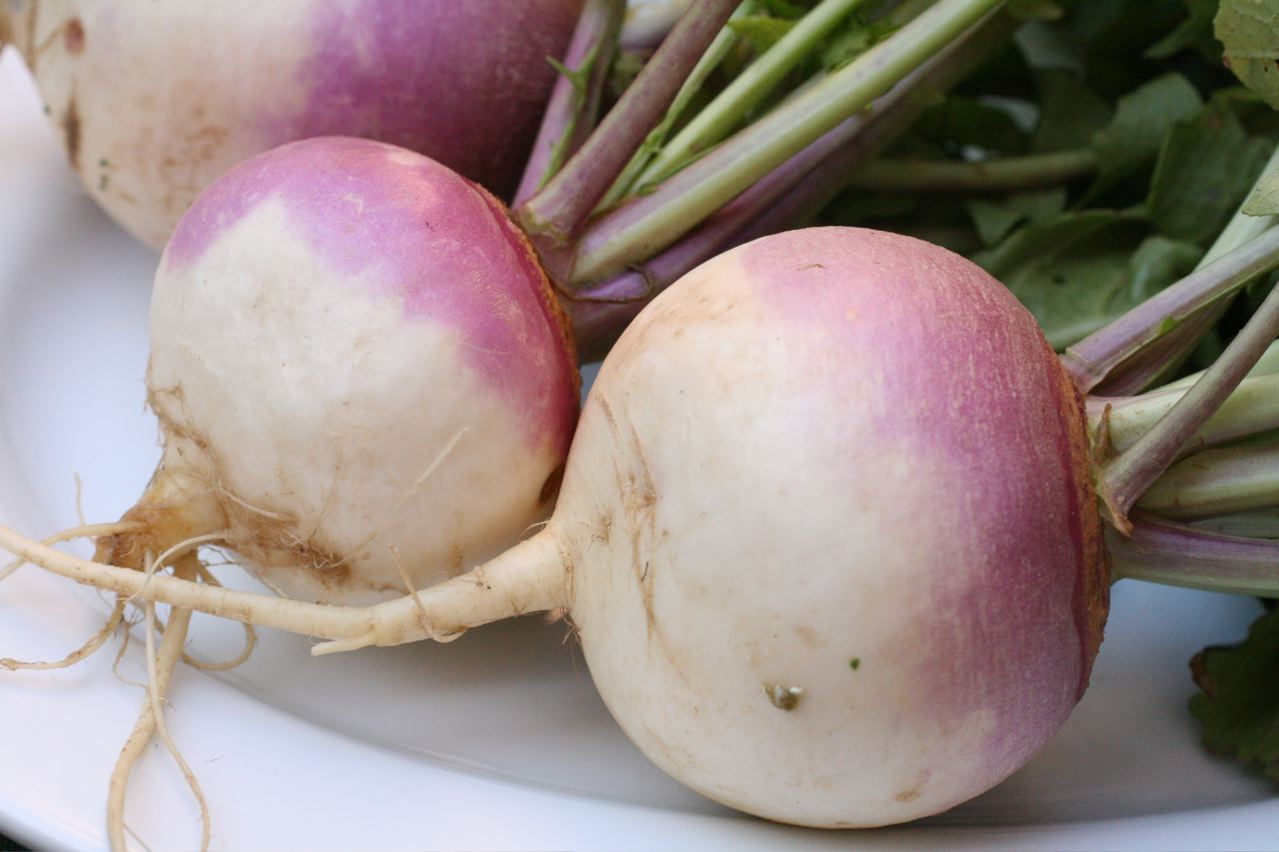
Turnips, a taproot

- Taproot (some types may incorporate substantial hypocotyl tissue)
  - Arracacia xanthorrhiza (arracacha)
  - Beta vulgaris (beet and mangelwurzel)
  - Brassica spp. (kohlrabi, rutabaga and turnip)
  - Bunium persicum (black cumin)
  - Burdock (Arctium, family Asteraceae)
  - Carrot (Daucus carota subsp. sativus)
  - Celeriac (Apium graveolens rapaceum)
  - Daikon – the large East Asian white radish (Raphanus sativus var. longipinnatus)
  - Dandelion (Taraxacum) spp.
  - Horseradish (Armoracia rusticana)
  - Lepidium meyenii (maca)
  - Microseris lanceolata (murnong or yam daisy)
  - Pachyrhizus spp. (jicama and ahipa)
  - Parsnip (Pastinaca sativa)
  - Petroselinum spp. (parsley root)
  - Radish (Raphanus sativus)
  - Scorzonera hispanica (black salsify)
  - Sium sisarum (skirret)
  - Tragopogon spp. (salsify)
  - Vigna lanceolata (bush carrot or bush potato)

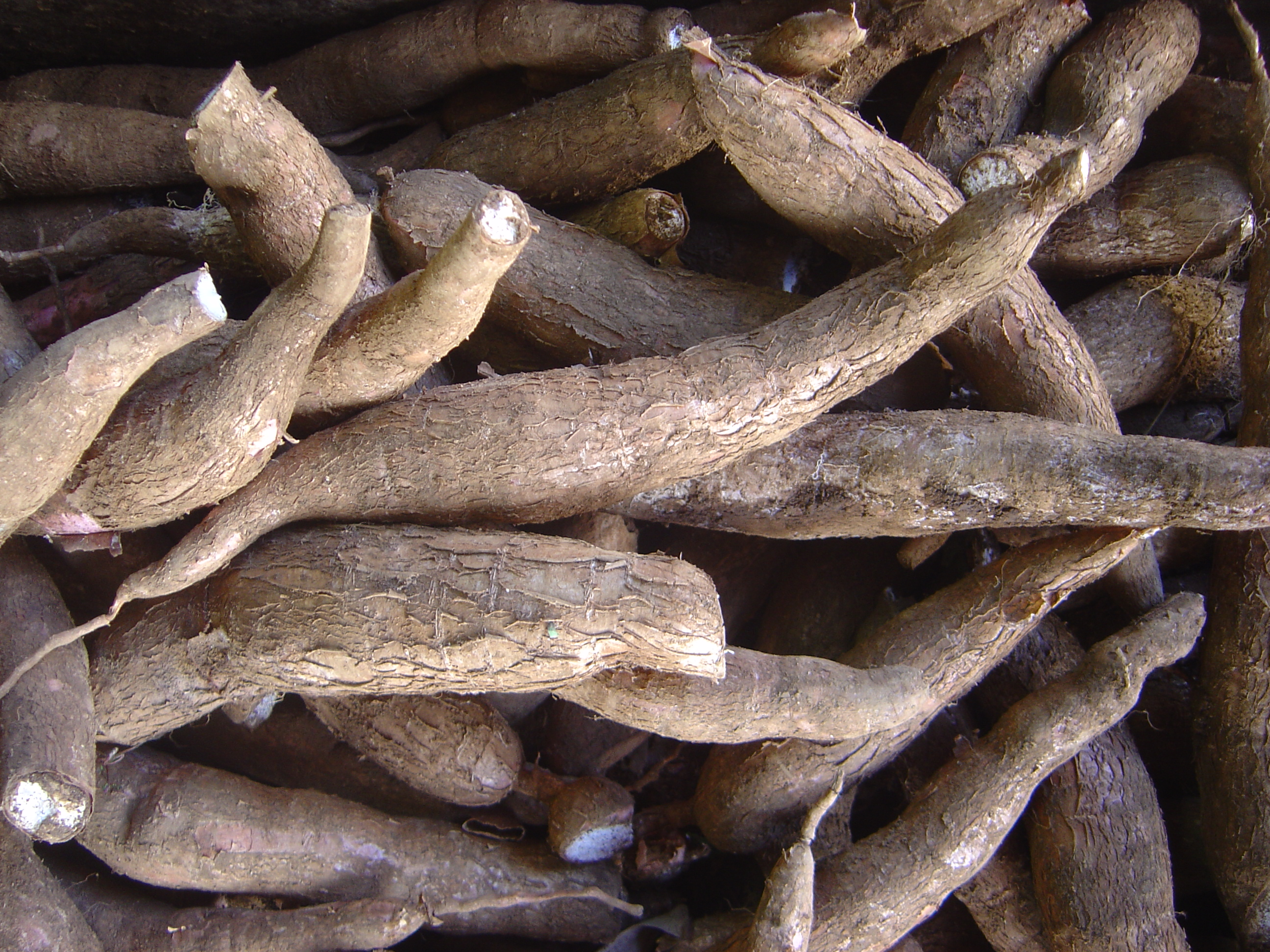
Cassava tuberous roots

- Tuberous root
  - Amorphophallus galbra (yellow lily yam)
  - Conopodium majus (pignut or earthnut)
  - Dioscorea spp. (yams, ube)
  - Dioscorea polystachya (nagaimo, Chinese yam, Korean yam, mountain yam, white ñame)
  - Hornstedtia scottiana (native ginger)
  - Ipomoea batatas (sweet potato or kūmara)
  - Ipomoea costata (desert yam)
  - Manihot esculenta (cassava or yuca or manioc)
  - Mirabilis expansa (mauka or chago)
  - Pediomelum esculentum (breadroot, tipsin, or prairie turnip)
  - Smallanthus sonchifolius (yacón)

== Uses ==
Many root vegetables keep well in root cellars, lasting several months. This is one way of storing food for use long after harvest, which is especially important in nontropical latitudes, where winter is traditionally a time of little to no harvesting. There are also season extension methods that can extend the harvest throughout the winter, mostly through the use of polytunnels.

Starchy root vegetables are of particular economic importance as staple foods, especially in tropical regions. They overshadow cereals throughout much of Central and West Africa, as well as Oceania, in these areas being used directly or mashed to make foods such as fufu or poi.
