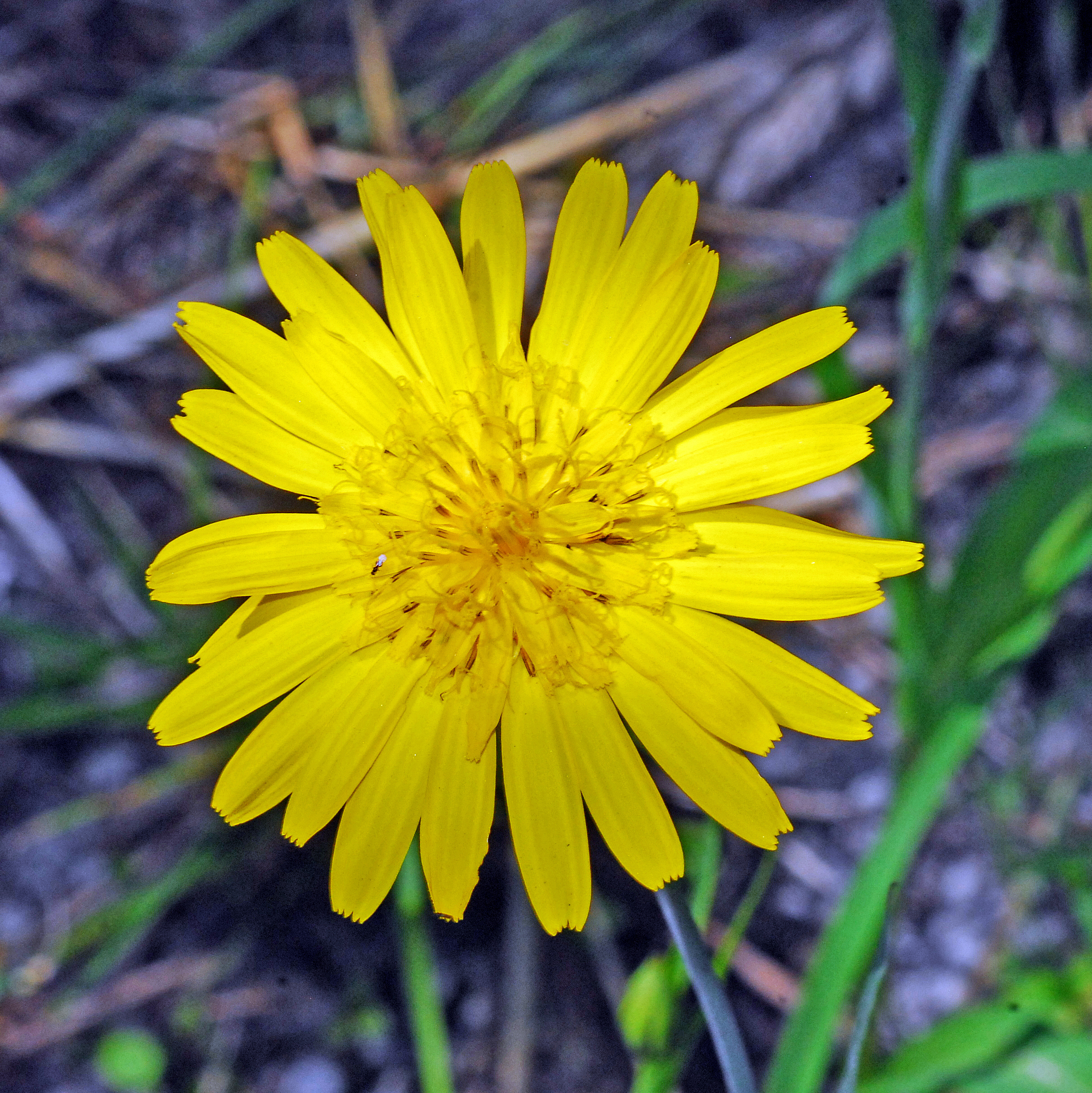
- Flower of Tragopogon orientalis

Scientific classification
- Kingdom: Plantae
- Clade: Tracheophytes
- Clade: Angiosperms
- Clade: Eudicots
- Clade: Asterids
- Order: Asterales
- Family: Asteraceae
- Genus: Tragopogon
- Species: T. orientalis

Binomial name
- Tragopogon orientalis L.

Synonyms
- List: Tragopogon longipappus Peterm.; Tragopogon melanantherus Klokov; Tragopogon moldavicus Klokov; Tragopogon novus Geners.; Tragopogon novus Geners. ex Steud.; Tragopogon orientalis subsp. orientalis L.; Tragopogon orientalis var. latifolius C.H.An; Tragopogon orientalis var. orientalis L.; Tragopogon orientalis var. parallelus Nyár.; Tragopogon orientalis var. revolutus (Schweigg.) Bisch.; Tragopogon orientalis var. transsilvanicus (Schur) Soó'; Tragopogon pratensis f. lamottei (Rouy) Rouy, 1908; Tragopogon pratensis subsp. orientalis (L.) Celak.; Tragopogon pratensis var. orientalis Schmalh.; Tragopogon revolutus Schweigg.; Tragopogon rumelicus Velen.; Tragopogon transcarpaticus Klokov; Tragopogon transsilvanicus Schur; Tragopogon xanthantherus Klokov; Tragopogon xantheranthus Klokov, 1965

= Tragopogon orientalis =

Species of plant

Tragopogon orientalis, common name Oriental goat's beard, is a hemicryptophyte herbaceous annual plant in the family Asteraceae.

== Taxonomy ==
This species was previously treated as a subspecies of Tragopogon pratensis, in contrast with latter molecular phylogenetic analyses.

== Distribution ==
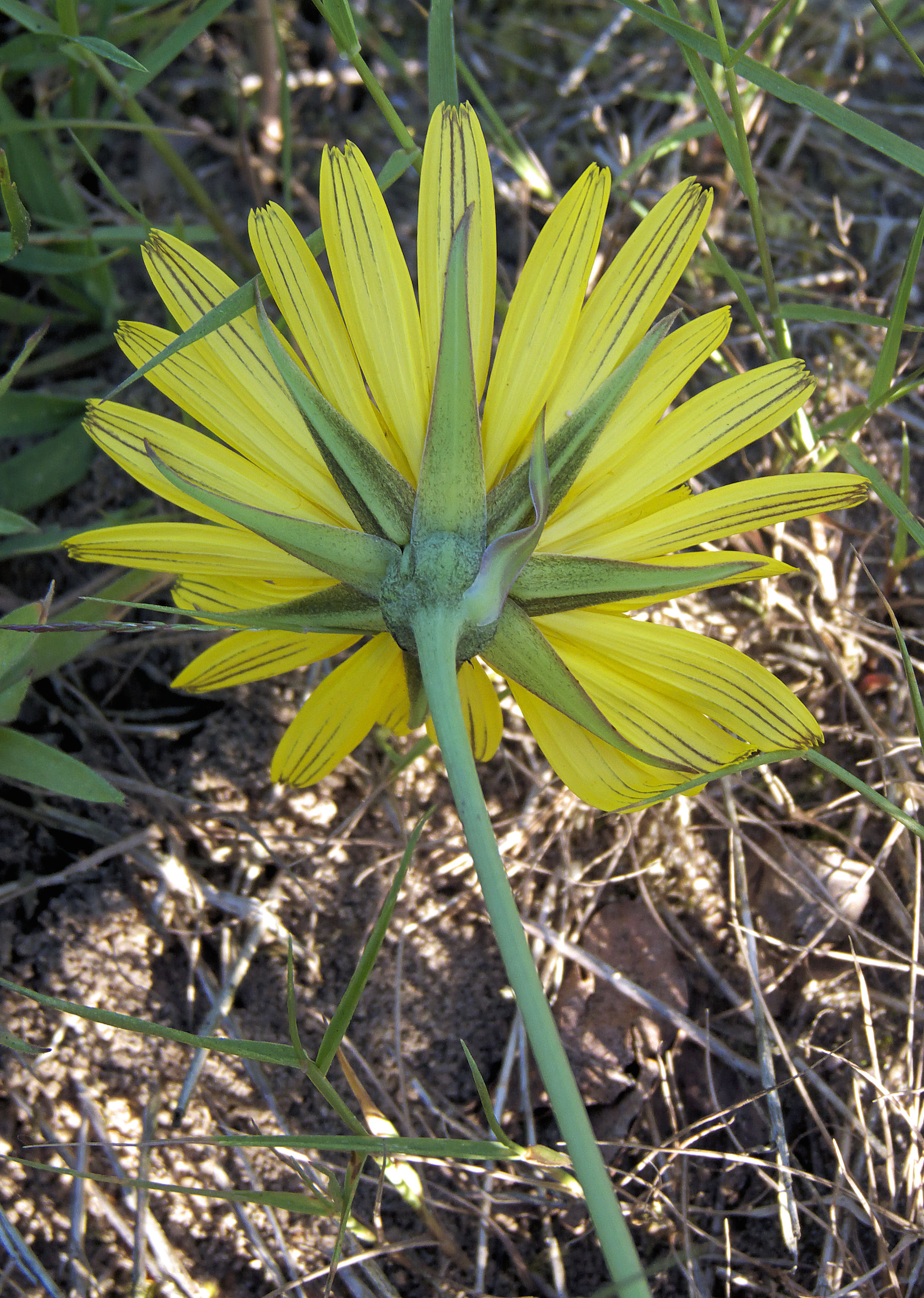
Tragopogon orientalis

This species is native to Eurasia, with a range from Europe to Siberia and Western Himalaya.

== Description ==
Tragopogon orientalis reaches approximately 40 cm (16 in) in height. The yellow flowers have a diameter of about 5–8 cm. Fruits are 15–20 mm long. Leaves are rather broad. These plants are characterized by the enlarged stem under the capitula and by the flowers that have the same size as the perianth.

== Biology ==
Flowering time lasts from May to September. This plant mainly grows in lowlands, hills, foothills and mountains.
