= Toussaintia =

Scientific classification
- Kingdom: Plantae
- Clade: Tracheophytes
- Clade: Angiosperms
- Clade: Magnoliids
- Order: Magnoliales
- Family: Annonaceae
- Genus: Toussaintia; Boutique

Genus of flowering plants

Toussaintia is a genus of flowering plants in the family Annonaceae. There are four species. All are native to Africa.

Species include:

- Toussaintia congolensis
- Toussaintia hallei
- Toussaintia orientalis
- Toussaintia patriciae
