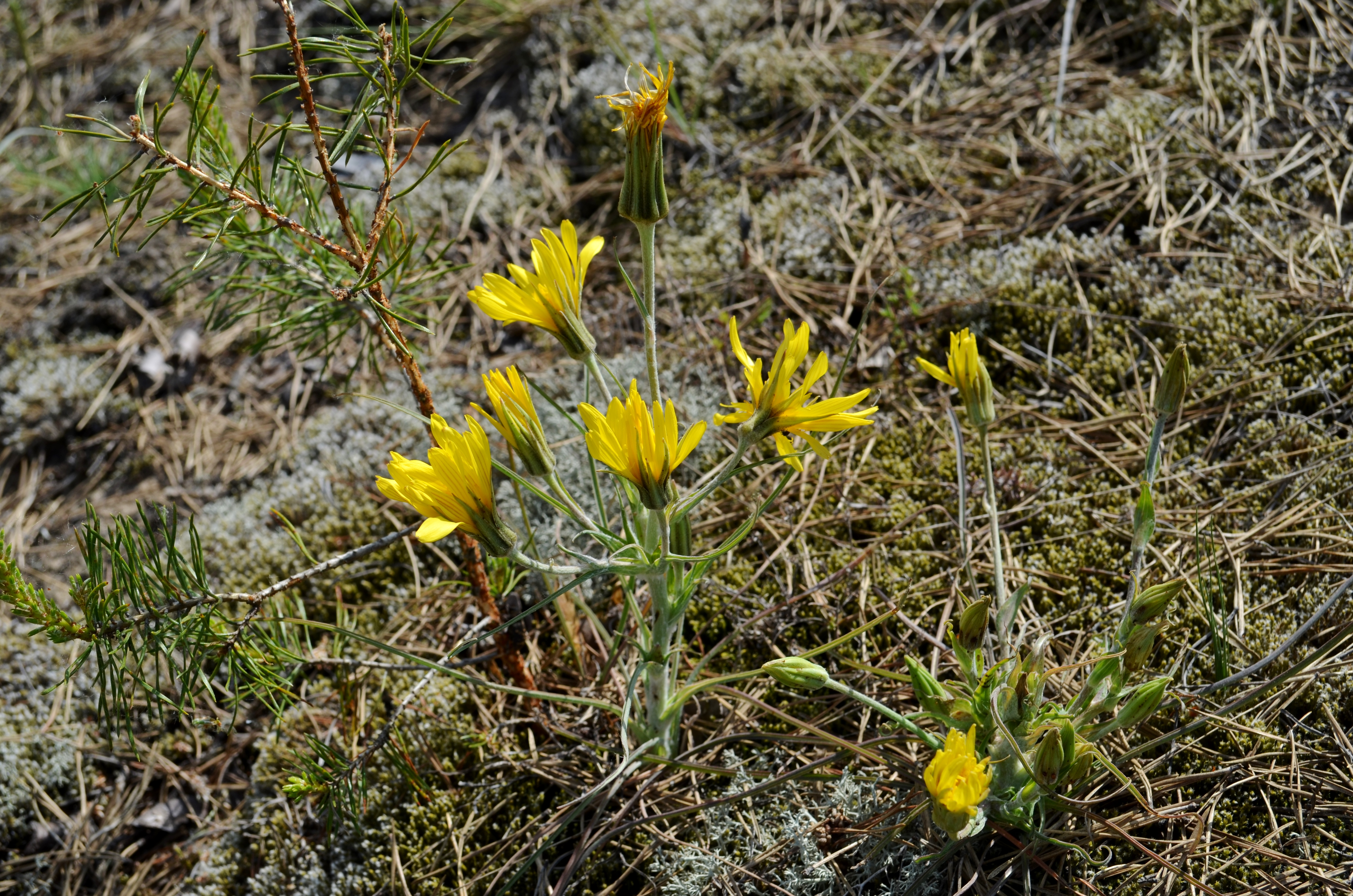

Scientific classification
- Kingdom: Plantae
- Clade: Tracheophytes
- Clade: Angiosperms
- Clade: Eudicots
- Clade: Asterids
- Order: Asterales
- Family: Asteraceae
- Genus: Tragopogon
- Species: T. gorskianus

Binomial name
- Tragopogon gorskianus Rchb.f.

= Tragopogon gorskianus =

Species of flowering plant

Tragopogon gorskianus is a species of flowering plant belonging to the family Asteraceae.

Its native range is Lithuania to Belarus.
