= Tragopogon acanthocarpus =

Scientific classification
- Kingdom: Plantae
- Clade: Tracheophytes
- Clade: Angiosperms
- Clade: Eudicots
- Clade: Asterids
- Order: Asterales
- Family: Asteraceae
- Genus: Tragopogon
- Species: T. acanthocarpus

Binomial name
- Tragopogon acanthocarpus Boiss.

Species of flowering plant

Tragopogon acanthocarpus is a species of salsify native to Iran and the South Caucasus.
