= Tragopogon miscellus =

Scientific classification
- Kingdom: Plantae
- Clade: Tracheophytes
- Clade: Angiosperms
- Clade: Eudicots
- Clade: Asterids
- Order: Asterales
- Family: Asteraceae
- Genus: Tragopogon
- Species: T. miscellus

Binomial name
- Tragopogon miscellus Ownbey

Species of plant

Tragopogon miscellus, the Moscow salsify, is a species native to the States of Washington and Idaho. Intensive studies over the course of many years have demonstrated that it originated as an allopolyploid hybrid between T. dubius and T. pratensis, both of which are European species naturalized in the US. Tragopogon miscellus has become established in the wild, reproducing by its own, thus deserving recognition as a species.

Tragopogon miscellus is an herb up to 150 cm (60 inches) tall. Leaves are slightly tomentose when young, nearly glabrous when mature, with a tip that is recoiled (curved backwards). Flowers are yellow.
