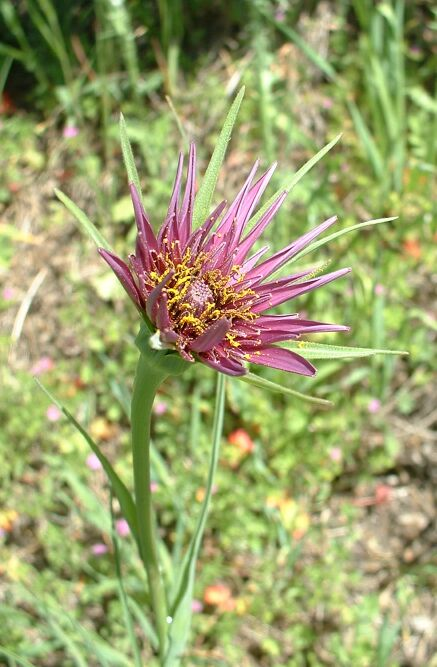
- Purple salsify (Tragopogon porrifolius)

Scientific classification
- Kingdom: Plantae
- Clade: Tracheophytes
- Clade: Angiosperms
- Clade: Eudicots
- Clade: Asterids
- Order: Asterales
- Family: Asteraceae
- Subfamily: Cichorioideae
- Tribe: Cichorieae
- Subtribe: Scorzonerinae
- Genus: Tragopogon; L.

Type species
- Tragopogon porrifolius L.

Synonyms
- Chromopappus Boriss.

= Tragopogon =

Goatsbeards

Genus of plants

Tragopogon, also known as goatsbeard or salsify, is a genus of flowering plants in the family Asteraceae. It includes the vegetable known as salsify, as well as a number of common wild flowers.

Salsifies are forbs growing as biennial or perennial plants. They have a strong taproot and milky sap. They generally have few branches, and those there are tend to be upright. Their leaves are somewhat grass-like. Flower colour varies within the genus, with some yellow species, and some bronze or purple. Seeds are achenes and are borne in a globe like that of a dandelion but larger, and are dispersed by the wind.

The salsifies are mostly natives of Europe and Asia, but several species have been introduced into North America and Australia and have spread widely there. There is one species sometimes considered native to North America, Tragopogon mirus, but it is in fact a hybrid of two non-native species.

Some of the more common species of Tragopogon are known, in the regions where they are most common, by the common names goat's beard, goatsbeard, salsify, or common salsify, without further qualification. These names are therefore inherently ambiguous, and best avoided, or reserved for the genus collectively. In the species list below, the first common name given is the one that seems to be most widely used for that species and is not in significant use for any other species.

The vegetable called salsify is usually the root of the purple salsify, Tragopogon porrifolius; the root is described as having the taste of oysters (hence the alternative common name "oyster plant" for some species in this genus), but more insipid with a touch of sweetness. The young shoots of purple salsify can also be eaten, as well as young leaves . Other species are also used in the same way, including the black or Spanish salsify, Scorzonera hispanica, which is closely related though not a member of the genus Tragopogon.

== Etymology ==
The name Tragopogon comes from Ancient Greek τράγος (trágos) 'billy goat' and πώγων (pṓgōn) 'beard'.

== Hybrid speciation ==
Salsifies are one example where hybrid speciation has been observed. In the early 1900s, humans introduced three species of goatsbeard into North America. These species, the western salsify (T. dubius), the meadow salsify (T. pratensis), and the oyster plant (T. porrifolius), are now common in urban areas. In the 1950s, botanists found two new species in the regions of Idaho and Washington, where the three already known species overlapped. One new species, Tragopogon miscellus, is a tetraploid hybrid of T. dubius and T. pratensis. The other species, Tragopogon mirus, is also an allopolyploid, but its ancestors were T. dubius and T. porrifolius. These new species are usually referred to as "the Ownbey hybrids" after the botanist who first described them. The T. mirus population grows mainly by reproduction of its own members, but additional episodes of hybrid speciation continue to add to the T. mirus population.

== Species ==
Accepted species

- T. acanthocarpus Boiss
- T. afghanicus Rech.f. & Köie
- T. agrostiphyllus Rech.f. & Köie
- T. alaicus Nikitin
- T. albinerve Freyn & Sint.
- T. albomarginatus Kitam.
- T. altaicus S.A.Nikitin & Schischk.
- T. angustissimus S.A.Nikitin
- T. armeniacus Kuth.
- T. artemczukii Klokov
- T. aureus Boiss.
- T. badachschanicus Boriss.
- T. bakhtiaricus Rech.f.
- T. balcanicus Velen.
- T. barbirostris Bisch.
- T. bjelorussicus Artemczuk
- T. bornmuelleri G.B.Ownbey & Rech.f.
- T. capitatus S.A.Nikitin
- T. castellanus Levier
- T. cazorlanum C.Díaz & Blanca
- T. charadzeae Kuth.
- T. clavulatus S.A.Nikitin
- T. coelesyriacus Boiss.
- T. colchicus Albov ex Grossh.
- T. collinus DC.
- T. coloratus C.A.Mey.
- T. conduplicatus S.A.Nikitin
- T. cretaceus S.A.Nikitin
- T. crocifolius L.
- T. cupani Guss. ex DC.
- T. dasyrhynchus Artemczuk
- T. dolichocarpus Klokov
- T. duarius Chenev.
- T. dubianskyi Krasch. & S.A.Nikitin
- T. dubius Scop. – western salsify, western goat's beard, wild oysterplant, yellow salsify, yellow goat's beard, meadow goat's beard, goat's beard, goatsbeard, common salsify, salsify
- T. elatior Steven
- T. elongatus S.A.Nikitin
- T. erostris Boiss. & Hausskn.
- T. fibrosum Freyn & Sint. ex Freyn
- T. filifolius Rehm. ex Boiss.
- T. flexuosus Sosn. ex Grossh.
- T. floccosus Waldst. & Kit. – woolly goatsbeard
- T. gaudanicus Boriss.
- T. glabrum G.Nicholson
- T. gongylorrhizus Rech.f.
- T. gorskianus Rchb.f.
- T. gracilis D.Don
- T. graminifolius DC.
- T. hayekii (Soó) I.Richardson
- T. heteropappus C.H.An
- T. hortensis Focke
- T. humilis Fisch.
- T. hybridus L. – pasture goatsbeard
- T. idae Kuth.
- T. iranicus Rech.f.
- T. jesdianus Boiss. & Buhse
- T. karelinii S.A.Nikitin
- T. karjaginii Kuth.
- T. kasahstanicus S.A.Nikitin
- T. kashmirianus G.Singh
- T. kemulariae Kuth.
- T. ketzkhovelii Kuth.
- T. khorasanicus Rech.f.
- T. kindingeri Adamov
- T. kopetdaghensis Boriss.
- T. krascheninnikovii S.A.Nikitin
- T. kultiassovii Popov ex S.A.Nikitin
- T. kurdicus Blakelock
- T. kurdistanicus Chrtek & Hadač
- T. lassithicus Rech.f.
- T. latifolius Boiss.
- T. leiorhynchus Klokov
- T. leonidae Kuth.
- T. leucanthus Rech.f.
- T. lamottei Rouy – jack-go-to-bed-at-noon
- T. makaschwilii Kuth.
- T. malikus S.A.Nikitin
- T. marginatus Pavlov
- T. melanantherus Klokov
- T. meskheticus Kuth.
- T. minor Mill.
- T. mirabilis Rouy – Ontario goatsbeard
- T. mirus Ownbey – remarkable goatsbeard
- T. miscellus Ownbey – hybrid goat's-beard, Moscow salsify
- T. moldavicus Klokov
- T. montanus S.A.Nikitin
- T. mutabilis Jacq.
- T. nebrodensis Guss.
- T. neglectum Hausskn.
- T. olympicus Boiss.
- T. orientalis L.
- T. otschiaurii Kuth.
- T. paradoxus S.A.Nikitin
- T. parviflorus Trev.
- T. perpusillus Arv.-Touv.
- T. persicus Boiss.
- T. phaeus Focke
- T. pichlerii Boiss.
- T. porphyrocephalus Rech.f.
- T. porrifolius L. – salsify, purple salsify, oyster plant, common salsify, goatsbeard
- T. praecox Focke
- T. pratensis L. – jack-go-to-bed-at-noon, meadow salsify or goatsbeard
- T. pseudocastellanus Blanca & C.Díaz
- T. pseudomajus S.A.Nikitin
- T. pterodes Pančić
- T. pubescens Kit.
- T. pusillus M.Bieb.
- T. rechingeri G.B.Ownbey
- T. reticulatus Boiss. & A.Huet
- T. rezaiyensis Rech.f.
- T. rhodanthus Sweet
- T. ruber S.G.Gmel.
- T. rumelicum Velen.
- T. ruthenicus Besser ex Claus
- T. sabulosus Krasch. & S.A.Nikitin
- T. samaritani Heldr. & Sart.
- T. savranicus Sobko
- T. scopoli Vill.
- T. segetus Kuth.
- T. serawschanicus S.A.Nikitin
- T. sibiricus Ganesch.
- T. silesiacus Krock.
- T. soltisiorum Mavrodiev
- T. songoricus S.A.Nikitin
- T. sosnowskyi Kuth.
- T. stribrnyi Hayek
- T. stroterocarpus Rech.f.
- T. subacaulis O.Schwarz
- T. subalpinus S.A.Nikitin
- T. tanaiticus Artemczuk
- T. tasch-kala Kuth.
- T. tauricus Klokov
- T. tesquicola Klokov
- T. tomentosulus Boriss.
- T. tommasinii Sch.Bip.
- T. trachycarpus S.A.Nikitin
- T. transcarpaticus Klokov
- T. transsilvanicus Hayek
- T. turkestanicus S.A.Nikitin
- T. ucrainicus Artemczuk
- T. vaginatus G.B.Ownbey & Rech.f.
- T. verrucosobracteatus C.H.An
- T. villosus L.
- T. vulgaris Gueldenst.
- T. vvedenskyi Popov
- T. xanthantherus Klokov
- T. × crantzii Dichlt. – Crantz's salsify
  - [ dubius × pratensis ]
- T. × neohybridus Farw. – newhybrid salsify
  - [ porrifolius × pratensis ]

Formerly included

The following species were once included in Tragopogon and are now regarded as better suited to other genera: Agoseris, Geropogon, Krigia, Lasiospora, Nothocalais, Podospermum, Scorzonera, Taraxacum, and Urospermum.
