= Toussaintia orientalis =

Conservation status
- Endangered (IUCN 3.1)

Scientific classification
- Kingdom: Plantae
- Clade: Embryophytes
- Clade: Tracheophytes
- Clade: Spermatophytes
- Clade: Angiosperms
- Clade: Magnoliids
- Order: Magnoliales
- Family: Annonaceae
- Genus: Toussaintia
- Species: T. orientalis

Binomial name
- Toussaintia orientalis Verdc.

Species of flowering plant

Toussaintia orientalis is a species of flowering plant in the family Annonaceae native to Tanzania and Kenya. The single known population in Kenya may now be extinct, but the plant is relatively abundant at some sites in Tanzania.

This is a small tree or shrub that grows in forest and bushland habitat. Some populations are located within reserves, where they receive some protection.
