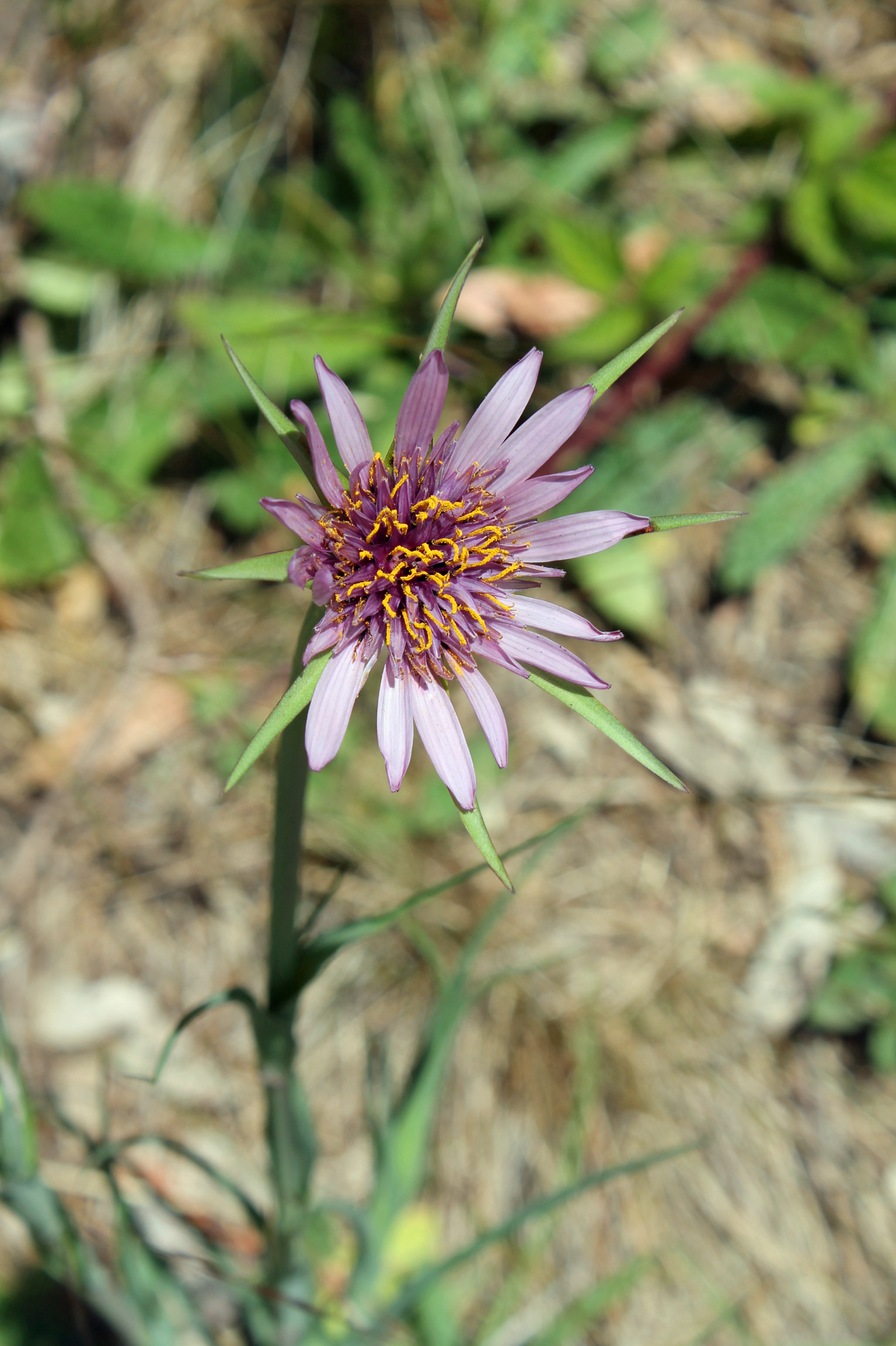

Scientific classification
- Kingdom: Plantae
- Clade: Tracheophytes
- Clade: Angiosperms
- Clade: Eudicots
- Clade: Asterids
- Order: Asterales
- Family: Asteraceae
- Genus: Tragopogon
- Species: T. porrifolius

Binomial name
- Tragopogon porrifolius L.

Synonyms
- Tragopogon australis Bourg. ex Nyman; Tragopogon australis Jord.; Tragopogon barbirostris Bisch.; Tragopogon brachyphyllus (Boiss.) Gand.; Tragopogon brachyphyllus (Boiss.) Nyman nom. inval.; Tragopogon claviculatus S.A.Nikitin; Tragopogon coelesyriacus Boiss.; Tragopogon cupani Guss. ex DC.; Tragopogon dshimilensis K.Koch; Tragopogon eriospermus Ten.; Tragopogon krascheninnikovii S.A.Nikitin; Tragopogon longirostris Sch.Bip.; Tragopogon macrocephalus Pomel; Tragopogon orgyalis Reut.; Tragopogon sativus Gaterau; Tragopogon sinuatus Avé-Lall.

= Tragopogon porrifolius =

Species of plant

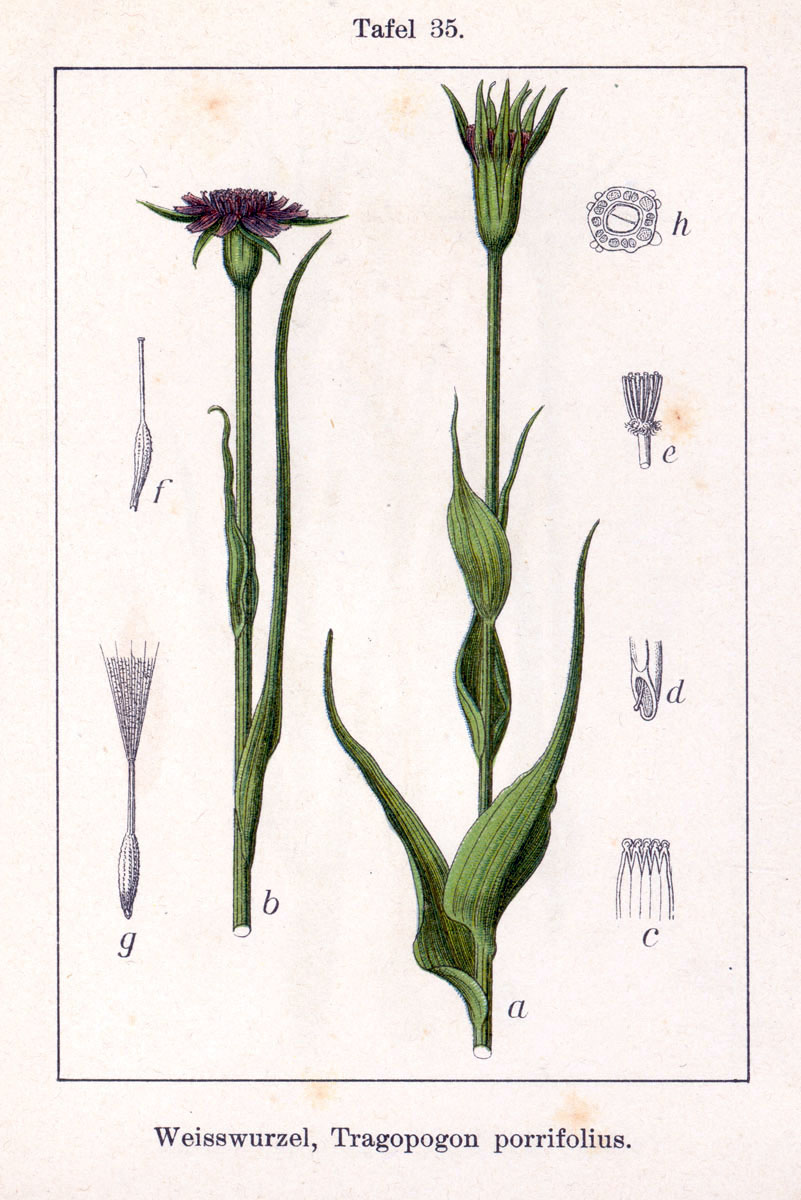
Illustration of parts

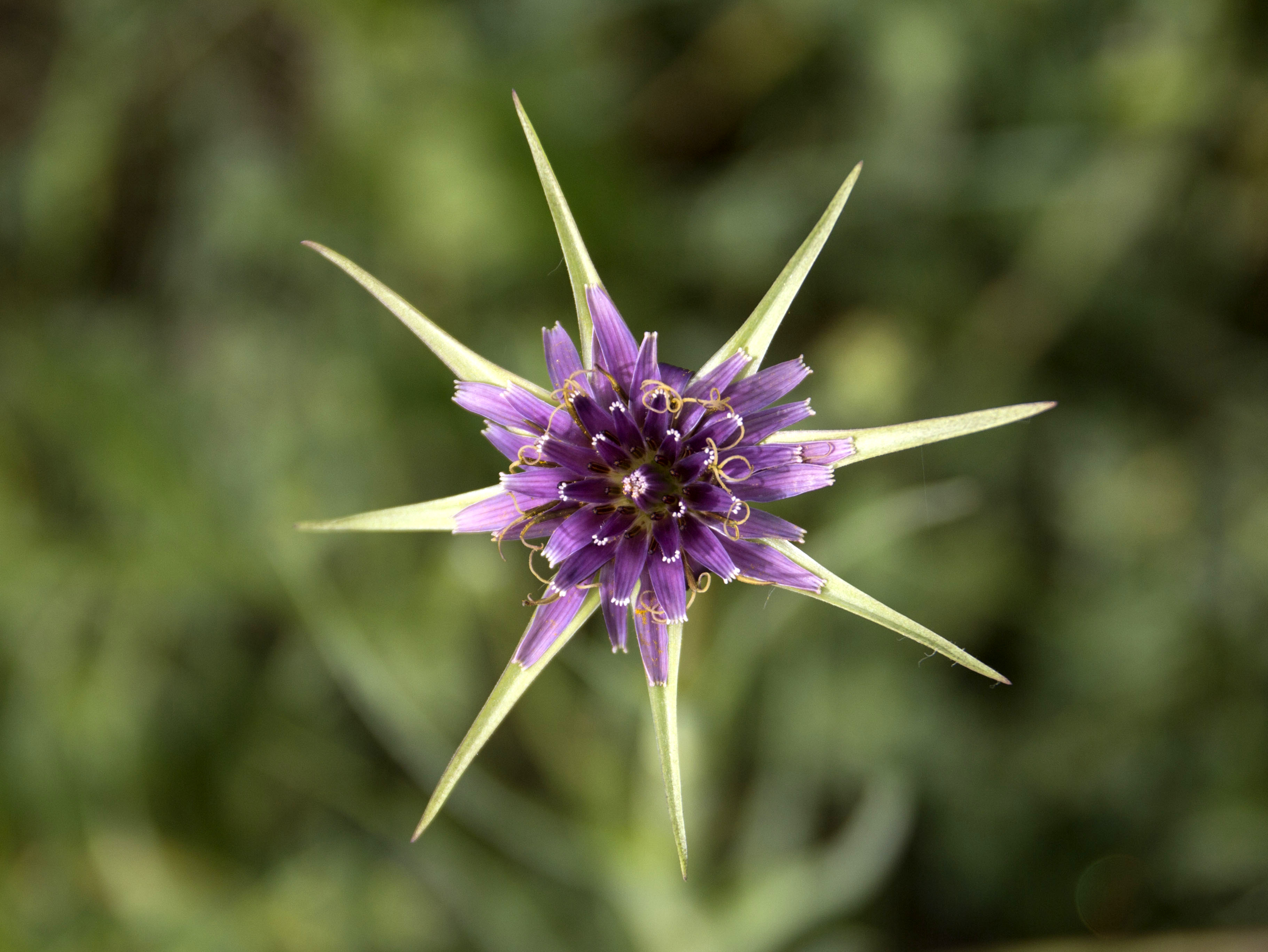
Tragopogon porrifolius – MHNT

Tragopogon porrifolius is a species of plant commonly known as purple or common salsify, oyster plant, vegetable oyster, Jerusalem star, Jack go to bed, goatsbeard, or simply salsify. These last two names are also applied to other species.

It grows wild in many places and is one of the most widely known species of the salsify genus, Tragopogon. It is cultivated for its ornamental flower and edible root.

== Description ==
The plant grows to 1.2 m (4 ft) in height. As with other Tragopogon species, its stem is largely unbranched and the leaves are somewhat grasslike, up to 30 cm (12 in) long. It exudes a milky juice from the stems. The taproots can become 15–30 cm (6–12 in) long and 2–5 cm (3/4–2 in) thick.

It typically flowers from June to September, but in warmer areas such as California it can be found in bloom from April. The flower head is purple and 5–7.5 cm (2–3 in) across and each is surrounded by 8–9 tapered bracts which are longer than the petals (technically, the ligules of the ray flowers). The flowers are hermaphroditic and pollinated by insects.

The fruits are beaked achenes, rod-shaped with light ribs. They have hairs at one end that facilitate wind dispersal. The achenes are 10–17 mm long and 1–3 mm wide without counting the beak, which is up to 55 mm in length. When the fruits are formed fully, the hairs from the fruits give the appearance of a ball of fluff which gives the plant its name "goatsbeard".

Tragopogon pratensis has similar but smaller flowers.

== Etymology ==
The Latin specific epithet porrifolius means "with leaves like leek" (Allium porrum).

== Distribution ==
Tragopogon porrifolius is a common biennial wildflower, native to southeast Europe, Mediterranean Turkey, and north Africa, but introduced elsewhere, for example, into the British Isles (mainly in central and southern England), other parts of northern Europe, North America and southern Africa, and in Australia. In the United States, it is now found growing wild in almost every state, including Hawaii, except in the extreme south-east.

== Cultivation ==
The root and the young shoots of T. porrifolius can be eaten (after being boiled). The freshly grown leaves can be eaten cooked or raw. Historically, the plant was cultivated for that purpose; it is mentioned by classical authors such as Pliny the Elder. Cultivation in Europe began in the 16th century in France and Italy. In the United Kingdom it was initially grown for its flower and later became a mildly popular vegetable in the 18th century but then declined in popularity. Presently the root is cultivated and eaten most frequently in France, Germany, Italy and Russia. However, in modern times it has tended to be replaced by Spanish salsify (Scorzonera hispanica) as a cultivated crop.

Cultivated varieties include 'White French', 'Gian French', 'Mammoth Sandwich Island', 'Improved Mammoth Sandwich Island', 'Blauetikett', and 'Lüthy'; they are generally characterised by larger or better-shaped roots. To maintain the purity of the cultivar a distance of 500 ft (150 m) has to be met. When T. porrifolius is grown for seed, it is harvested in the second season from midsummer to early autumn to select for bolt resistance. The root becomes discoloured and spoils quickly if broken, which can easily happen since it is difficult to remove from the soil without damage.

=== Sowing and soil requirements ===
Salsify is grown similarly to other root vegetables like parsnip and carrots and thus requires similar attention. Sowing can be done in late summer or early winter to foster an early growth. Planting can also be done in early spring about 100 days before the first frosts in a well prepared soil, preferably a loam or silt-loam. It should be done at the depth of 1.3 to 2 cm. Spacing between rows should be around 45 to 60 cm and the seeds should be separated by 3 cm approximately. This represent 12 g of seeds per 10 m of row for the cultivar 'Mammoth Sandwich Island'. A thinning to 5 cm between the plants is needed when the seedlings reach 5 cm. T. porrifolius needs deep and loose soils which are not too dry for a good development of the taproot. Stony or waterlogged soils have negative effects on yields and hamper harvesting. Other root crops, legumes and cereals have been mentioned as possible preculture. T. porrifolius is a moderate feeder, therefore the application of fresh manure does not improve yields. During the main growing period a good water supply prevents potential branching of the taproot.

=== Climate requirements ===
There are no specific requirements known for the cultivation of T. porrifolius, but they have been successfully cultivated in temperate climate zones. The seedlings need a temperature of 8–16 °C to germinate and the plant will freeze between −1.1 and −1.6 °C. T. porrifolius can cope with low temperatures and is not injured by light freezing.

=== Growth and development ===
The seeds need 8–10 days of germination time. T. porrifolius is a biennial plant. In the first year only the vegetative parts of the plant are developed. In autumn, the energy is stored in the root system, which is depending on the variety more or less branched. In the second season the generative purple flowers evolve. They bloom from early to mid summer.

=== Harvest and storage ===
The taproots are usually harvested from late autumn onwards (later than October in the Northern Hemisphere) and during winter. Harvesting after a frost is favoured to improve the taste of the root. After flowering, the taproot becomes stringy and inedible. The taproots can be stored in traditional clamps although refrigerated storage has been recommended at 0 °C and 90–95% relative humidity for 2–4 months.

=== Pests and diseases ===
Few pests or diseases affect T. porrifolius. White rust (Albugo tragopogonis) is the most common disease. Closely related wild species (e.g. Tragopogon pratensis), black salsify (Scorzonera hispanica), gerbera (Gerbera) and sunflower (Helianthus annuus) are also found to be hosts of this fungus. At an early stage chlorotic spotting is visible on leaves and stems. These develop during the course of disease into small white blisters.

Occasional problems are reported with rust diseases caused by Puccinia hystericum, Puccinia jackyana and Puccinia scorzonera. Mulching with oats and the use of spring vetch (Vicia sativa) or blue tansy (Phacelia tanacetifolia) as cover crops reduces the number of fungi infecting seedlings and roots. The following fungi have been isolated from T. porrifolius seedlings and roots: Alternaria alternata, Fusarium culmorum, Fusarium oxysporum, Penicillium spp., Rhizoctonia solani and Sclerotinia sclerotiorum.

When the rows are planted too close together, powdery mildew (Erysiphe cichoriacearum) can affect the plants.

When the roots are left in the ground over winter, mice and voles may nibble them.

Salsify, raw
Nutritional value per 100 g (3.5 oz)
- Energy: 343 kJ (82 kcal)
- Carbohydrates: 18.6 g
- Dietary fiber: 3.3 g
- Fat: 0.2 g
- Protein: 3.3 g
Vitamins and minerals
Vitamins	Quantity %DV^{†}
Thiamine (B1)	7% 0.08 mg
Riboflavin (B2)	17% 0.22 mg
Niacin (B3)	3% 0.5 mg
Pantothenic acid (B5)	7% 0.371 mg
Vitamin B6	16% 0.277 mg
Folate (B9)	7% 26 μg
Vitamin C	9% 8 mg
Minerals	Quantity %DV^{†}
Calcium	5% 60 mg
Iron	4% 0.7 mg
Magnesium	5% 23 mg
Manganese	12% 0.268 mg
Phosphorus	6% 75 mg
Potassium	13% 380 mg
Sodium	1% 20 mg
Zinc	3% 0.38 mg
- Other constituents: Quantity
- Water: 77 g
- Link to USDA Database entry
- ^{†}Percentages estimated using US recommendations for adults, except for potassium, which is estimated based on expert recommendation from the National Academies.

== Uses ==
A latex derived from the root can be used as a chewing gum.

=== As food ===
The plant is edible, but the roots and leaves are most palatable when collected before the flower stalk is produced. The root is noted for having a mild taste when uncooked, described as like asparagus or oysters, from which the plant derives its alternative name of oyster plant. The outer layers can be scraped off, with the root dipped in cold water to preserve its colour. If too tough for eating, they can be boiled with a pinch of baking soda and a change of water. Raw young roots can be grated for use in salads, but older roots are better cooked. They can be added to soups, stews or stir-fries. Salsify purée (alone or including potato) is recommended with fish.

The flowering shoots can be used like asparagus, either raw or cooked and the flowers can be added to salad, while the sprouted seeds can be used in salads or sandwiches.

Raw salsify is 77% water, 19% carbohydrates, 3% protein and contains negligible fat. In a 100 gram reference amount, raw salsify supplies 82 calories and moderate contents of riboflavin, vitamin B6, vitamin C, manganese and phosphorus.

== Phytochemicals ==
Tragopogon porrifolius contains polyphenol phytochemicals which are under preliminary research for their potential biological effects. Tragopogon species are being studied at the biochemical level for their novel enzyme forms and genetic polymorphism.
