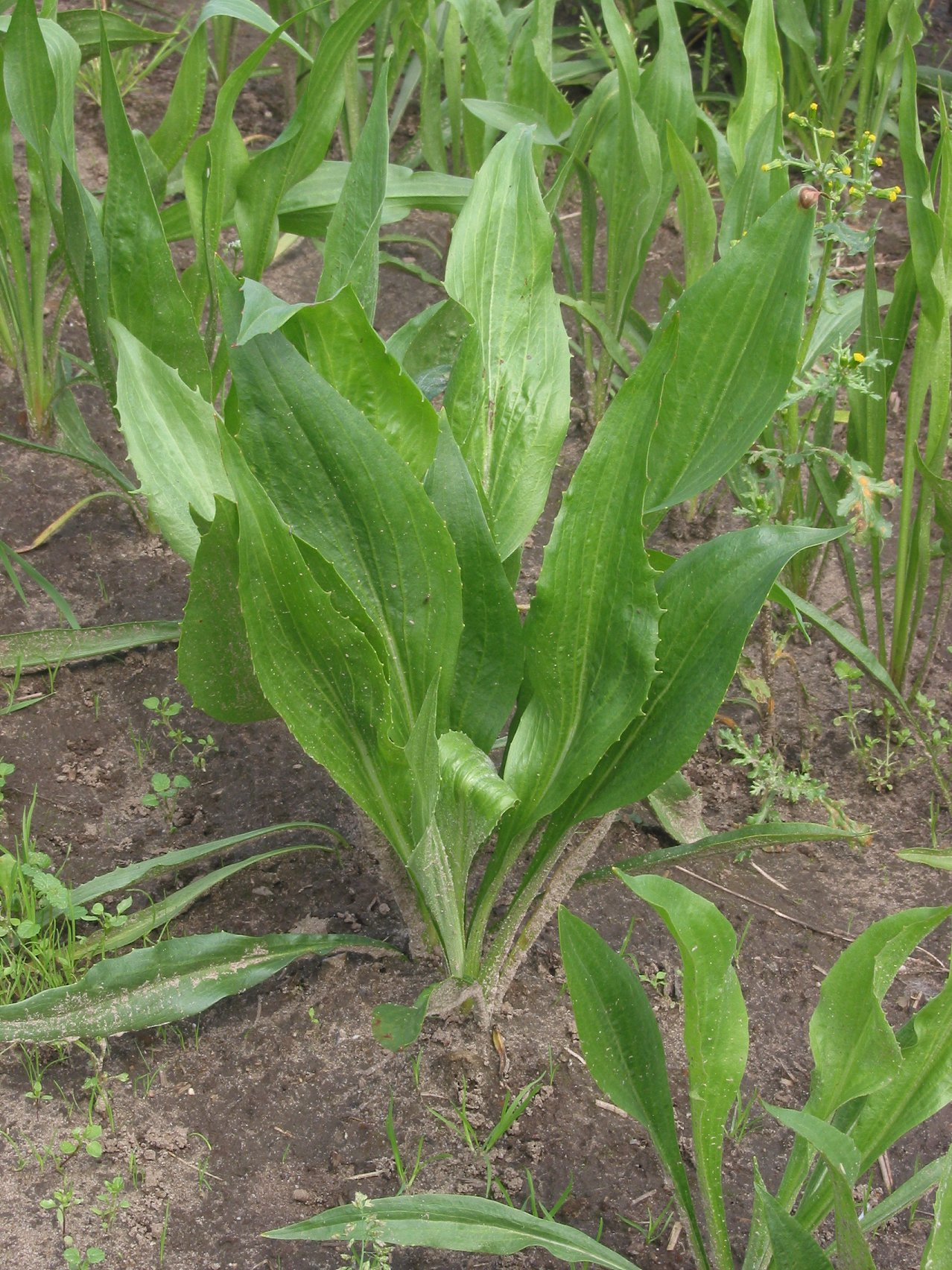

Scientific classification
- Kingdom: Plantae
- Clade: Tracheophytes
- Clade: Angiosperms
- Clade: Eudicots
- Clade: Asterids
- Order: Asterales
- Family: Asteraceae
- Genus: Pseudopodospermum
- Species: P. hispanicum

Binomial name
- Pseudopodospermum hispanicum (L.) Zaika, Sukhor. & N.Kilian

Synonyms
- Myscolus hispanicus (L.) Endl.; Scorzonera hispanica L.; Scorzonera hispanica var. genuina Pau

= Pseudopodospermum hispanicum =

Species of plant

Pseudopodospermum hispanicum, commonly known as black salsify or Spanish salsify, also known as black oyster plant, serpent root, viper's herb, viper's grass or scorzonera, is a perennial species of plant in the sunflower family (Asteraceae), cultivated as a root vegetable in the same way as purple salsify (Tragopogon porrifolius), also in the sunflower family. It is native to Southern Europe and cultivated as a crop in Southern and Central Europe. It grows on nutrient poor soils, dry pasture, rocky areas, in thickets and on limy or marly soils of temperate zones.

== Description ==
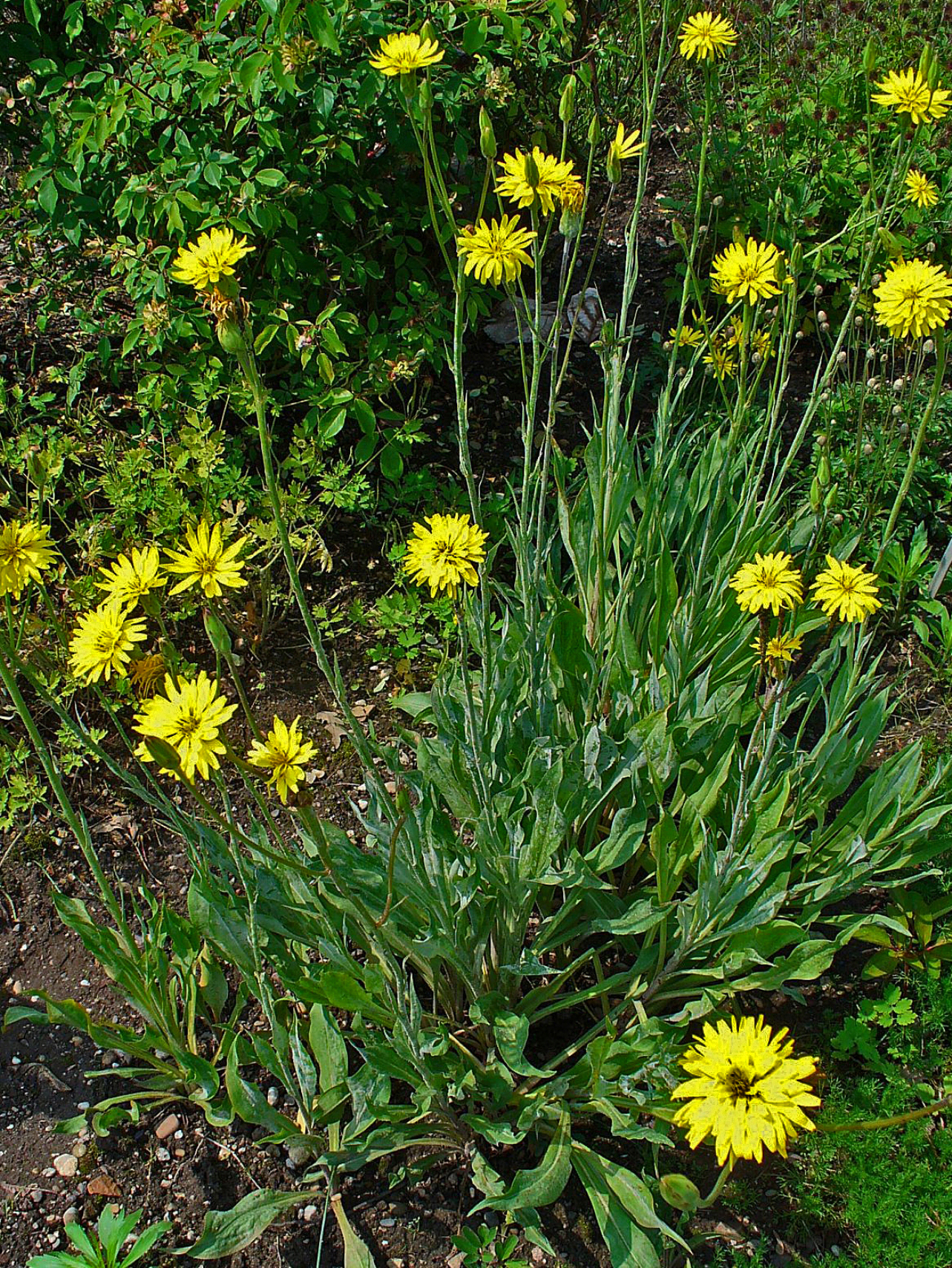
Flowering Pseudopodospermum hispanicum

Pseudopodospermum hispanicum is grown commercially as an annual, although it is a biennial plant. After a vegetative phase in the first year, the plant flowers in its second year and can reach a height of 60 cm with a stem diameter of 5 cm. The hermaphroditic flowers are insect-pollinated. The flower-head is terminal and consists of yellow ray florets. The stem is smooth and leafy and the leaves are lanceolate to ovate with entire margins. Black salsify forms a long cylindrical taproot with a brownish to black cork layer. If harvested young, the carrot-like roots are tender, long and tapered with shiny white flesh. They contain a milky latex, which turns the roots black when exposed to air.

== History ==
Black salsify is native to Southern Europe and the Near East. As is indicated by its binomial name, it is generally thought to have spread to the rest of Europe from Spain, but the first mention of the vegetable by a Western writer came from Leonhard Rauwolf, who reported seeing scorzonera at the market of Aleppo in Syria, in 1575. In 1612, François Gentil, in his Le Jardinier Solitaire (The Lonely Gardener), described the Spanish salsify as the best root which can be grown in gardens. By 1683, the use of the root as a garden vegetable is recorded in England. Quintyne in France, in 1690, calls it "one of our chiefest roots."

It was believed that the plant makes a good antidote against bites of venomous animals. Based on this, it was often claimed that the name scorzonera derives from the Old French word scorzon meaning snake (or "adder" to be exact). The most likely etymological root, though, is the Catalan word escurçonera, deriving from escurçó (viper), where the suffix -nera conveys an association or use with regards to vipers. Scorzonera must be an italian transliteration of escurçonera, explained by the long Catalan presence in Sardinia and southern Italy, influencing local languages between the 14th and 18th centuries. Less likely, the name might derive from Italian scorza negra meaning "black bark"/"black peel", after the dark brown to black skin of the root. The plant was being cultivated as a vegetable in Italy and France by 1660 and, soon after, vast fields were grown of it in what is now Belgium.

== Nutritional value ==
Black salsify is considered nutritious: it contains proteins, fats, asparagine, choline, laevulin, as well as minerals such as potassium, calcium, phosphorus, iron, sodium, and vitamins A, B_{1}, E and C. It also contains the polysaccharide inulin, conferring a mild sweetness that is suitable for diabetics. Inulin, used as a dietary fibre, may have a positive effect on the digestive system, blood circulation, kidneys and inhibit cancerous processes.

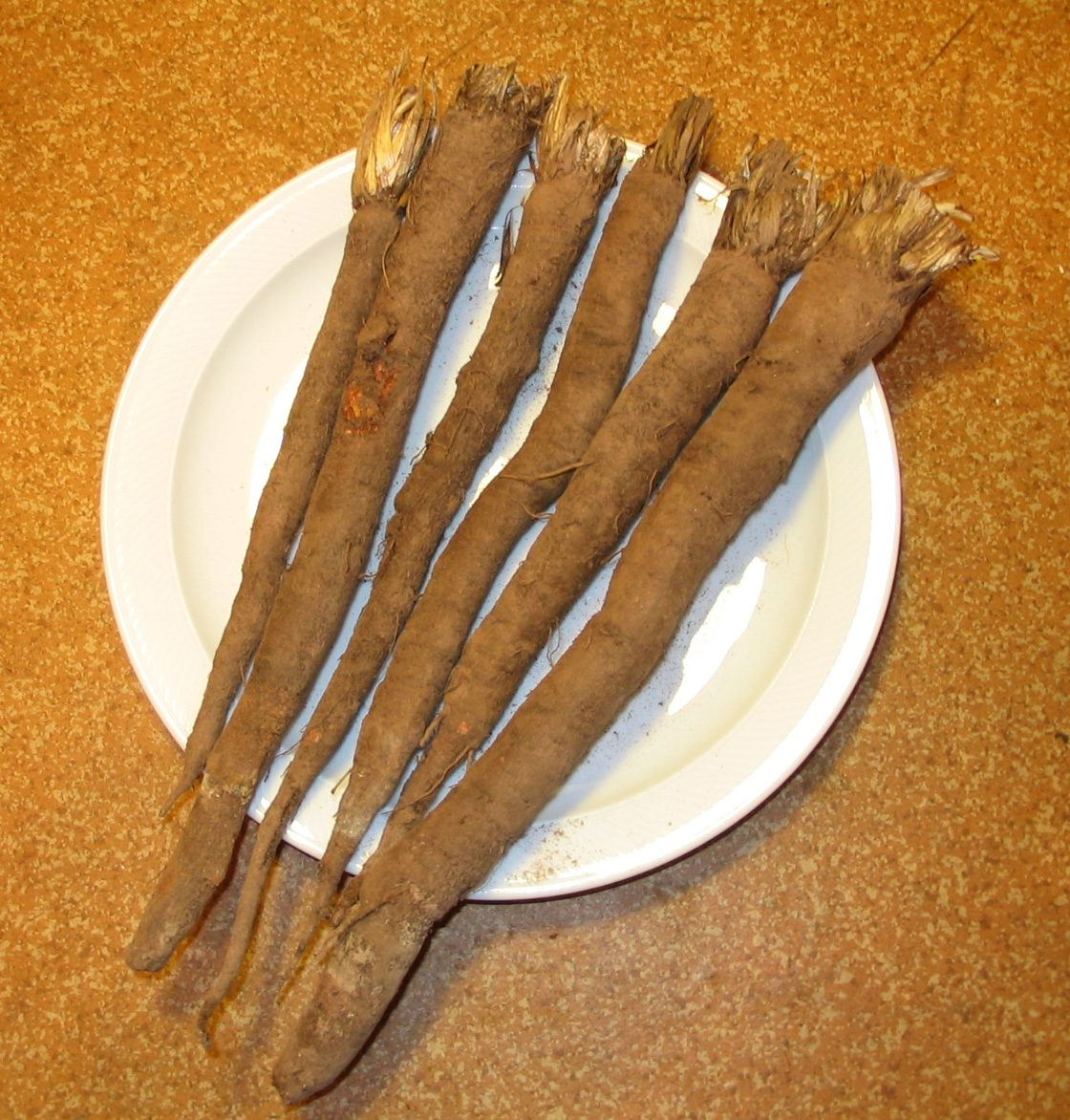
Black salsify roots

== Preparation ==
Various parts of the plant can be consumed, including roots, leafy shoots, and open flowers, either cooked or raw. The principal product however are the stem tuber roots. The thick black skin of the salsify root is usually considered inedible and can be removed either prior to or after boiling. If the skin is removed prior to boiling, the peeled root should be immediately immersed in water mixed with vinegar or lemon juice, in order to prevent discolouring. Since the root contains an extremely sticky latex, it is often more convenient to peel it after boiling the root for 20 to 25 minutes (or less). Residue of the latex can be removed by rubbing with a drop of oil and then washing with soap.

Black salsify is often eaten together with other vegetables, such as peas and carrots. But it is also popular served like asparagus in a white sauce, such as bechamel sauce, mustard sauce or hollandaise sauce. Boiled salsify roots may also be coated with batter and deep fried. The young roots are used in salads and the salsify latex can be used as chewing gum. Flowering shoots are consumed similarly to asparagus and the flowers can be added to salads, together with brown seedlings or the long clumps of grass-like green leaves.

The scorzonera sweet is a crystallized dessert made from scorzonera in Évora, Alentejo, Portugal. It is listed on the Ark of Taste.

== Cultivation ==
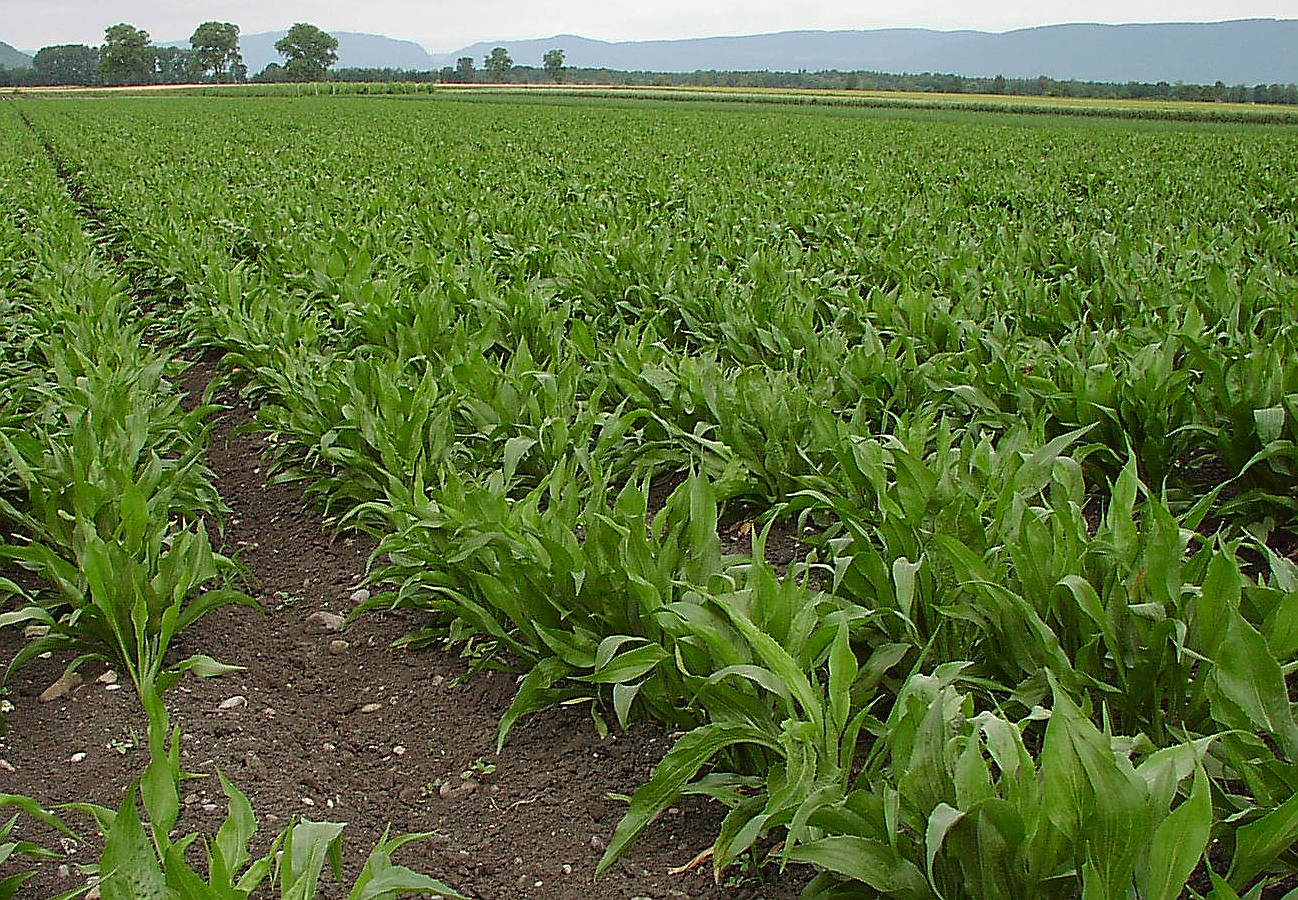
Commercial production in Germany

Black salsify is hitherto mainly a European crop. Belgium, France and the Netherlands are the world's largest producers of black salsify; significant amounts are also produced in Germany. In the latter country, 'Hoffmanns Schwarzer Pfahl' is a cultivar widely used by commercial growers, while 'Duplex' is popular among small-scale gardeners. Some other cultivars are commercially available, but because it was a rather localized crop before being produced for a wider market there are comparatively few landraces. Collections of local races and old cultivars can be found at the Nordic Genetic Resource Center in Sweden and the Vavilov Institute of Plant-Genetic Resources in Russia.

=== Cultivars ===
Black salsify cultivars differ in taste, size, region of origin and harvest time. The following table shows some popular examples.

Table 1: Three common black salsify cultivars and their attributes
Cultivar	Attributes
Hoffmanns Schwarzer Pfahl	tried and tested; good storage; easy harvest
Duplex	high yield; long and straight roots; great taste
Einjährige Riesen	long, straight, black roots; easy to harvest; nice flavor

Breeding objectives are reduced susceptibility to bolting, low percentage of roots with cavities, improved suitability for mechanical sowing and harvesting, as well as for industrial processing.

=== Sowing ===
Scorzonera is sown in early spring, preferably at the end of April. Sowing too early can result in early flowering and loss of yield. About 12 kg of seeds per hectare are required. The seeds are sown directly into shallow furrows at a depth of 1.5 – 2 cm with 30–50 cm in between them. Plants should stand at a density of 50 plants/m^{2} for optimal yield. Because of the seeds’ unusual shape, machine sowing is difficult. Storage of seeds is also a critical point, as germination is usually only guaranteed for 1–2 years. Optimal storage conditions are dry and cool.

=== Soil requirements ===
The roots develop best in very light textured, sandy soil. Any stones or gravel in the ground can cause root deformation. Ideal pH values are between 5.8 – 6.5 and liming is recommended for more acidic soils. A high humus content is beneficial. Generally, the species can grow in a variety of conditions and has potential to be grown as a cash crop in less favorable, marginal environments in temperate zones.

=== Harvesting and post-harvest treatment ===
Harvesting takes place from November to March, with the optimum time for high quality being end of December. The process is somewhat complicated, as the roots are quite fragile, and broken material loses its freshness. Entire roots will keep fresh all winter if stored in a cool dark place, due to their robust black corky skin. In root cellars they may keep fresh well into springtime. The roots can also be washed, peeled, cut and then frozen. In supermarkets, they can be bought conserved in glass or canned. On farmer’s markets, the roots are sold unwashed to secure quality and freshness. Black salsify is, however, very hardy and frost-resistant and will grow well in most cool-temperate climates and usually yield 15–20 tonnes of roots per hectare. In British gardens it is common to profit from its perennial character by leaving it in the ground until its roots have grown to sufficient size for harvesting; this can take two years. Commercially, it can be grown best as the year's second crop. It is recommended to have three to four years in the crop rotation before the cultivation of other Asteraceae.

== Pests and diseases ==
=== Pests ===
- Carrot rust fly (Psila rosae): The larvae or maggots of the carrot rust fly eat the plant roots and entrench themselves in the roots. Psila thereby inhibits plant growth and facilitates infection by soft-rot bacteria. Generally root crops are popular for the carrot rust fly.
- Wireworms (Selatosomus destructor and Ctenicera pruinina): The wireworms are the larvae of click beetles, which remain in the larval stage for between 2–5 years. They live in the soil and feed on roots. The wireworms cause a lot of damage when they bore directly into the roots. Plant pathogens can gain access through this, which can lead to rotting of the roots. Root rot can lead to wilting, stunting and deformation of the seedlings and eventually to death.
- Root knot nematode (Meloidogyne incognita, M. javanica, M. hapla and M. arenaria): Can cause great damage to the roots of salsify. Nematode activity damages growing root tips, causing branching, distortion, stunting and deformation of the taproot. The result can be general stunting, wilting and leaf chlorosis (yellowing) above ground.

=== Diseases ===
- Bacterial soft rot (Bacillus carotovorus Jones): The bacteria eat the root core. This can be recognised by a soft, watery and slimy root rot. This in turn facilitates infection by vertical fungi or bacteria. The ideal temperature for bacterial soft rot is 21 °C - 27 °C, but it can survive and cause damage at temperatures between 0 °C - 32 °C. For this reason, the air must be properly ventilated when storing and transporting the crop in tropical and warm environments.
- White blister (Albugo spp.): a leaf disease that favours wet weather. It is related to the pathogens of downy mildew and the two can also occur together. White blisters form blister-like white pustules on the underside of the leaves. A purple pigmentation is visible around the affected areas. This reduces plant growth and heavily infested plant parts may shrivel or even die.
