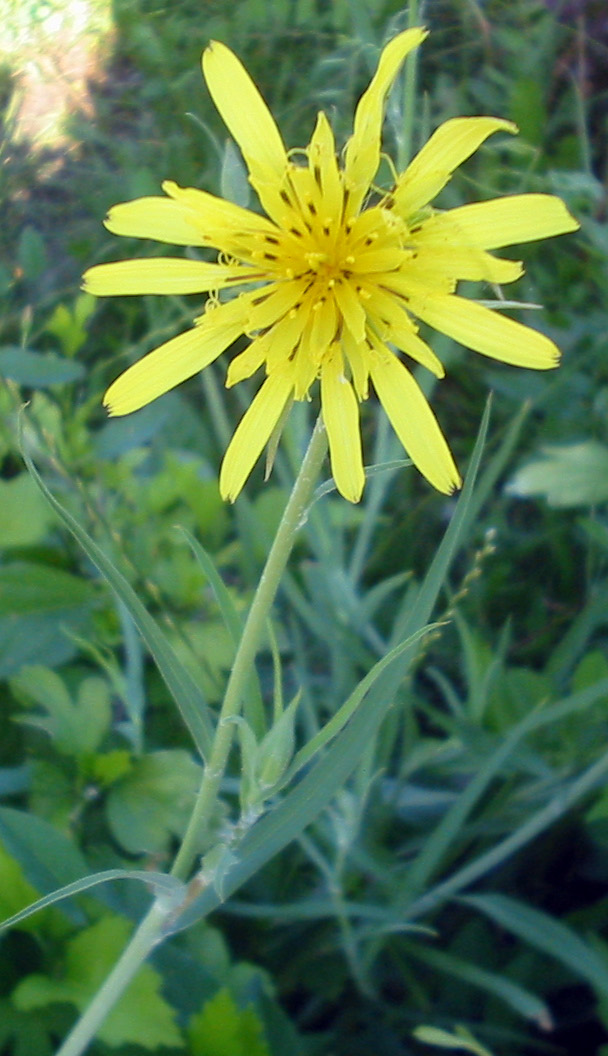
- Tragopogon pratensis subsp. pratensis

Scientific classification
- Kingdom: Plantae
- Clade: Tracheophytes
- Clade: Angiosperms
- Clade: Eudicots
- Clade: Asterids
- Order: Asterales
- Family: Asteraceae
- Genus: Tragopogon
- Species: T. pratensis

Binomial name
- Tragopogon pratensis L.

= Tragopogon pratensis =

Species of plant

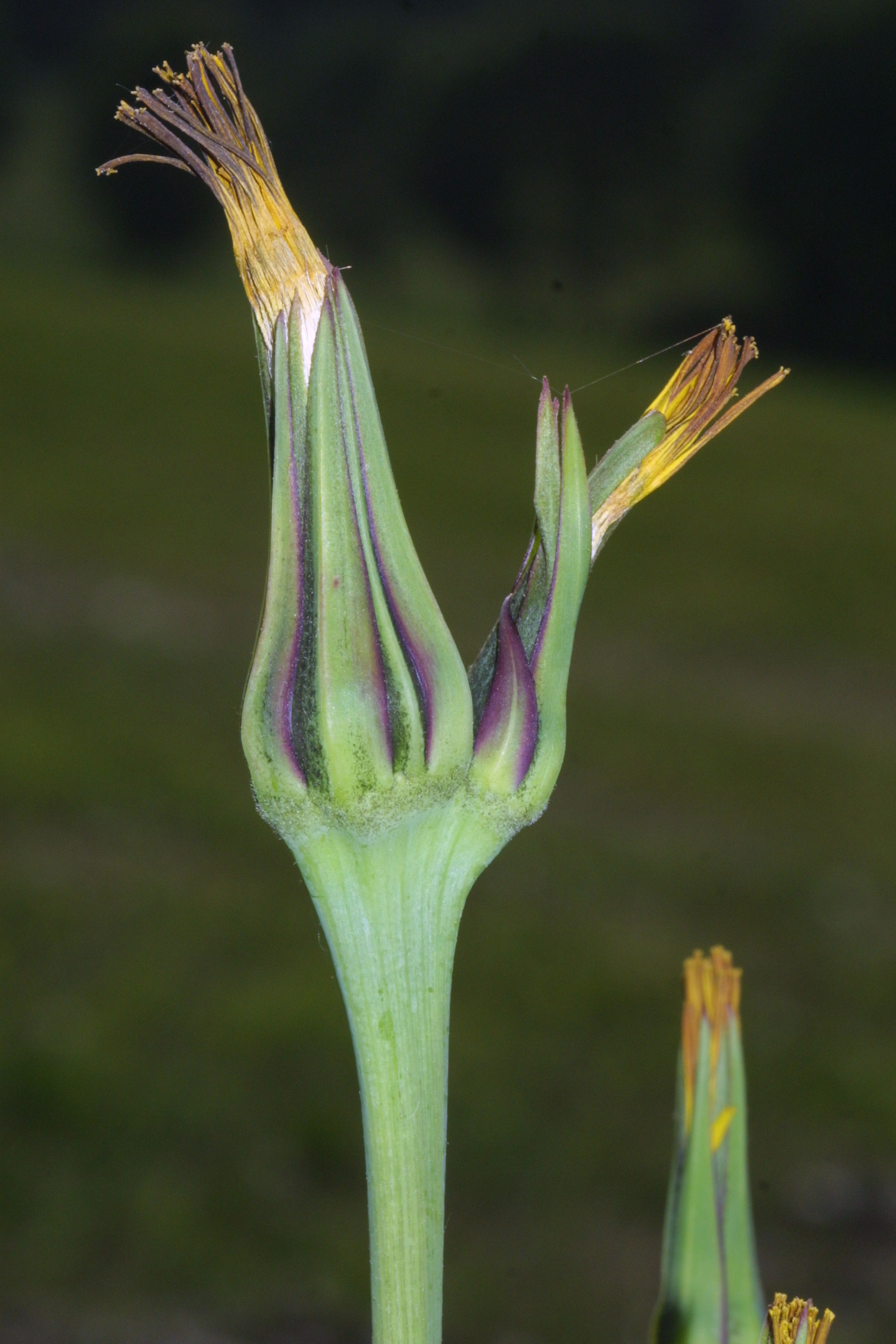

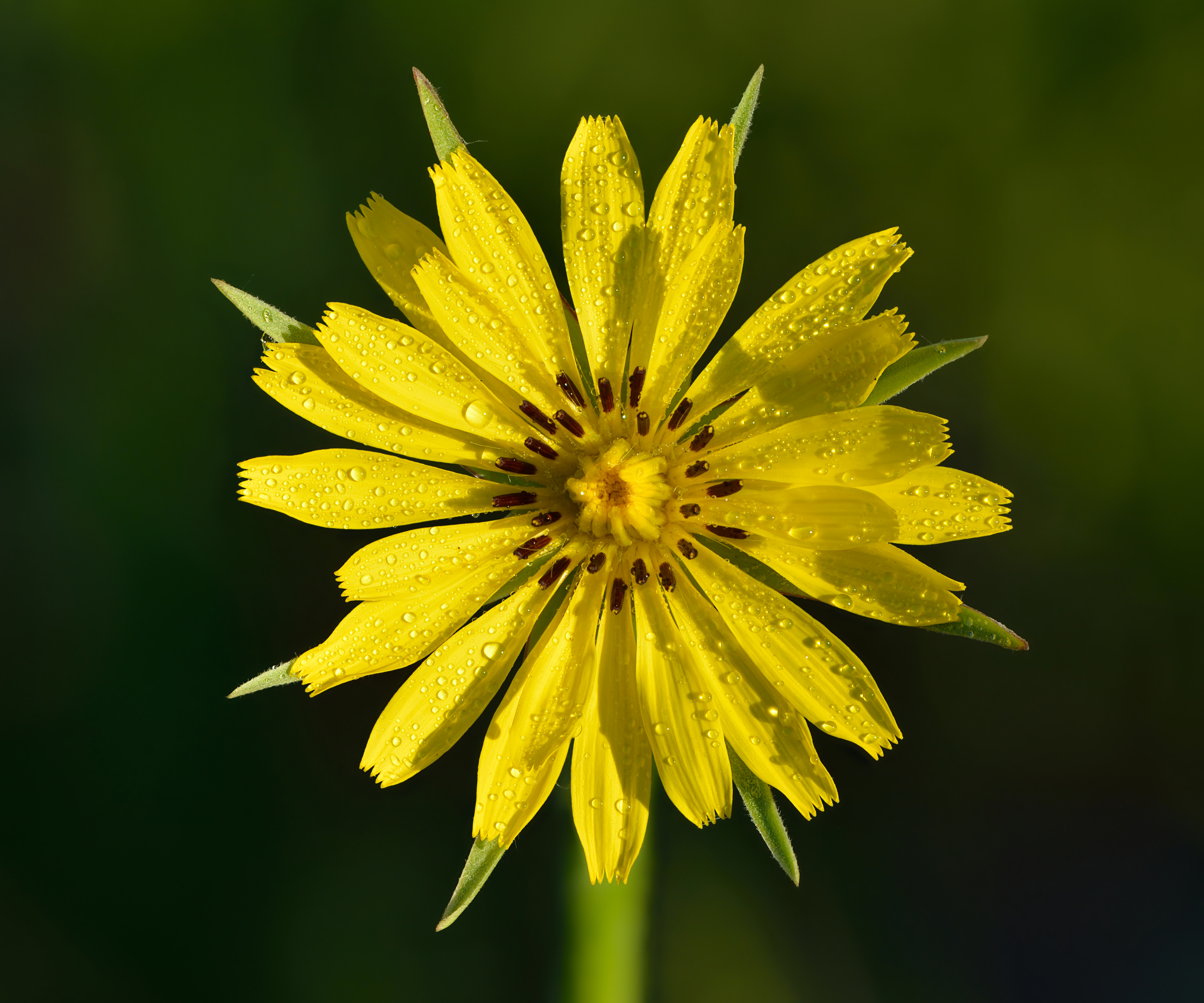
Inflorescence

Tragopogon pratensis (common names Jack-go-to-bed-at-noon, meadow salsify, showy goat's-beard or meadow goat's-beard) is a biennial plant in the family Asteraceae. It flowers between June and October.

It is distributed across Europe and North America, commonly growing in fields. The root and buds are edible, and it has a milky latex.

== Description ==
The plant grows up to 76 cm (30 in) tall. The lower leaves are 10 to 30 cm long, lanceolate, keeled lengthwise, grey-green, pointed, hairless, with a white midrib. The upper leaves are shorter and more erect. It is the only United Kingdom dandelion-type flower with grasslike leaves.

On display between June and October, the flower heads are yellow and 15–25 millimetres (5/8–1 in) wide. They only open in the morning sunshine, hence the name 'Jack go to bed at noon'.

The achenes are rough, long beaked pappus radiating outwards interwoven like a spider's web of fine white side hairs (referred to as a "blowball").

=== Similar species ===
It differs from viper's-grass (Scorzonera humilis) in that viper's-grass has short, pale green bracts, whereas in goat's-beard they are long and pointed.

== Distribution and habitat ==
It is distributed across Europe and North America, commonly growing in fields (hence its name) and on roadsides. It is found in North America from southern Ontario to Massachusetts; most of England; on the eastern and southern edges of Scotland; and central Ireland but not the coastal edges.

== Uses ==
The roots can be boiled and eaten like potatoes. The fresh stems and buds can be cooked like asparagus and the young leaves can be eaten raw.
