= Priyanka Maurya =

Indian homeopath (born 1988)

Dr. Priyanka Maurya
- Born: 27 August 1988 (age 37)
- Citizenship: Indian
- Education: Bachelor of Homeopathic Medicine and Surgery
- Alma mater: Jiwaji University, Gwalior
- Occupations: Indian homeopath, social worker, politician
- Political party: Bhartiya Janta Party (2022- Present)
- Other political affiliations: Indian National Congress- 2020-2022
- Spouse: Abhishek Kumar
- Awards: Women of Excellence Award (2020); RedFM Achievers Award (2021); Corona Warrior Award (2020)

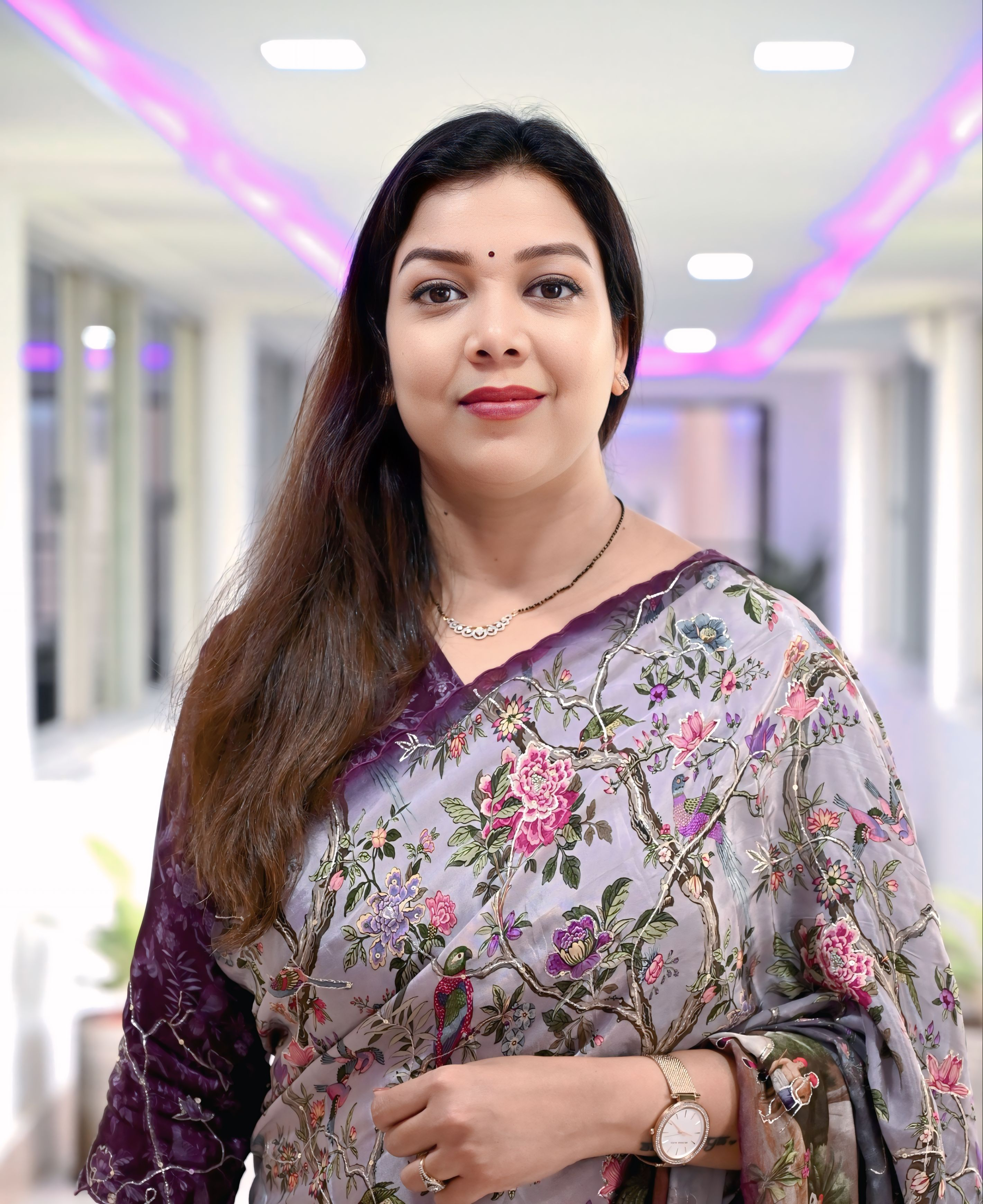
Dr. Priyanka Maurya

Dr. Priyanka Maurya, an Indian homeopath, social worker and politician, gained fame as the face of Congress's "Ladki Hoon Lad Sakti Hoon" campaign led by Priyanka Gandhi Vadra to empower women in Uttar Pradesh. However, she later accused Congress of corruption and joined the Bharatiya Janata Party.

== Early life and education ==
Priyanka Maurya, born on 27 August 1988 in Azamgarh, Uttar Pradesh, completed her schooling at Children College, Azamgarh, and earned a degree in Homeopathic Medicine and Surgery from Jiwaji University, Gwalior.

== Personal life ==
She married Abhishek Kumar on December 7, 2015, and enjoys traveling and cooking.

== Political career ==
Starting in 2020 with the Congress, she rose to prominence as the face of the "Ladki Hoon Lad Sakti Hoon " campaign she joined the BJP in 2022 and is now the state Spokesperson for Uttar Pradesh BJP.

== Awards ==
She received the Women of Excellence Award (2020) and multiple Corona Warrior Award for her contributions.
