= Manmohan Parida =

- Born: 24 November 1967 (age 58); India
- Education: Orissa University of Agriculture and Technology; Indian Veterinary Research Institute; Jiwaji University
- Known for: Studies on viral infections
- Awards: 2011 N-BIOS Prize
- Scientific career
- Fields: Virology; Microbiology
- Workplaces: Defence Research and Development Establishment

Dr. Manmohan Parida (born 24 November 1967), Sc ‘H’ is the director of the Indian Defence Research and Development Establishment (DRDE) in Gwalior. He assumed the position with effect from 1 October 2021. He obtained his graduation in Veterinary Science from Odisha Veterinary College as best graduate with three Gold Medals into his credit. He earned his master's degree in Veterinary Virology from prestigious Indian Veterinary Research Institute, Mukteswar and further obtained his Doctorate Jiwaji University, Gwalior in Microbiology. He was also awarded with Monbusho Fellowship from Japanese Govt and pursued Post Doctoral Research Scientist at Institute of Tropical Medicine, WHO reference center for research on arboviruses, Nagasaki, Japan.

== Biography ==
Dr Parida is a virologist with three decades of scientific and techno managerial experience in the field of Medical Virology. His core areas of research encompasses strategic Biodefence (Biocontainment & Bioverification) R & D with significant contributions in the field of rapid detection technologies, antiviral drug development, new generation vaccine candidates, molecular epidemiology, genotyping, phylogenetic evolution and trafficking of emerging viruses of biomedical importance. He has established National Apex Referral Laboratory for Dengue, Chikungunya, Swine Flu, COVID19 under Infectious Disease Surveillance Programme. He is spearheading the DRDO Biothreat Mitigation Programme and working on establishment Maximum Microbial containment complex (BSL4) facility as a National Biodefence Referral Laboratory in the country for mitigation of future biothreat emergencies.

He has established advanced molecular diagnostics based on gene amplification technologies (RT-PCR and RT-LAMP) for large number of viruses viz; Dengue, JE, Chikungunya, West Nile, Swine Flu, SARS, COVID19. He has the distinction introducing LAMP technology in India. He has also developed RT-LAMP tests for high risk biothreat viral agents viz, Ebola, Smallpox, CCHF, KFD, Nipah viruses through synthetic gene based approach. The Swine Flu RT-LAMP technology has been transferred to M/s RAS Life Science and has been approved by ICMR with DCGI clearance as an alternate indigenous technology to WHO approved CDC RT-PCR. He has also established the Test & Evaluation Facility (Synthetic Blood Penetration, Wet bacterial penetration, Viral penetration) for testing the Biosuits & Biomasks. In addition, He has also developed field deployable mobile containment laboratory “PARAKH” for rapid on site detection which was also used for testing of COVID-19 samples during the on-going pandemic at Mysore Medical College.

He was member of various Inter-ministerial Task forces (ICMR, ICAR, DBT), Technical and Joint working group (TWG & JWG) committees for formulation of policy proposal and guidelines. He has published 139 research papers in peer-reviewed journals (with overall C.I.-7213, h-Index-43, i10 Index-96) and supervised 8 Ph D students. He has 3 international patents and 10 national patents granted to his credit. He was ranked among top 10 researchers in the field of Immunology & Microbiology as per DST- Elsevier Bibliometric analysis (2009–14). He is also ranked among top 2% of Scientists of the World in the field of Biomedical Research (Virology) as per the 2021 data base prepared by Stanford University, USA. All these sincere efforts are being recognized through various National awards from DRDO (DRDO Scientist of the Year Award, DRDO Technology Group Award), ICMR (Basanti Devi Amirchand Prize), DBT (National Bioscience Award), DST(Technology commercialization Award) and other academic/professional bodies (NASI-Reliance Platinum Jubilee Award, Samanta Chandra Sekhar Award by Odisha Bigyan Academy) etc. He is also a Fellow of Indian Virological Society.

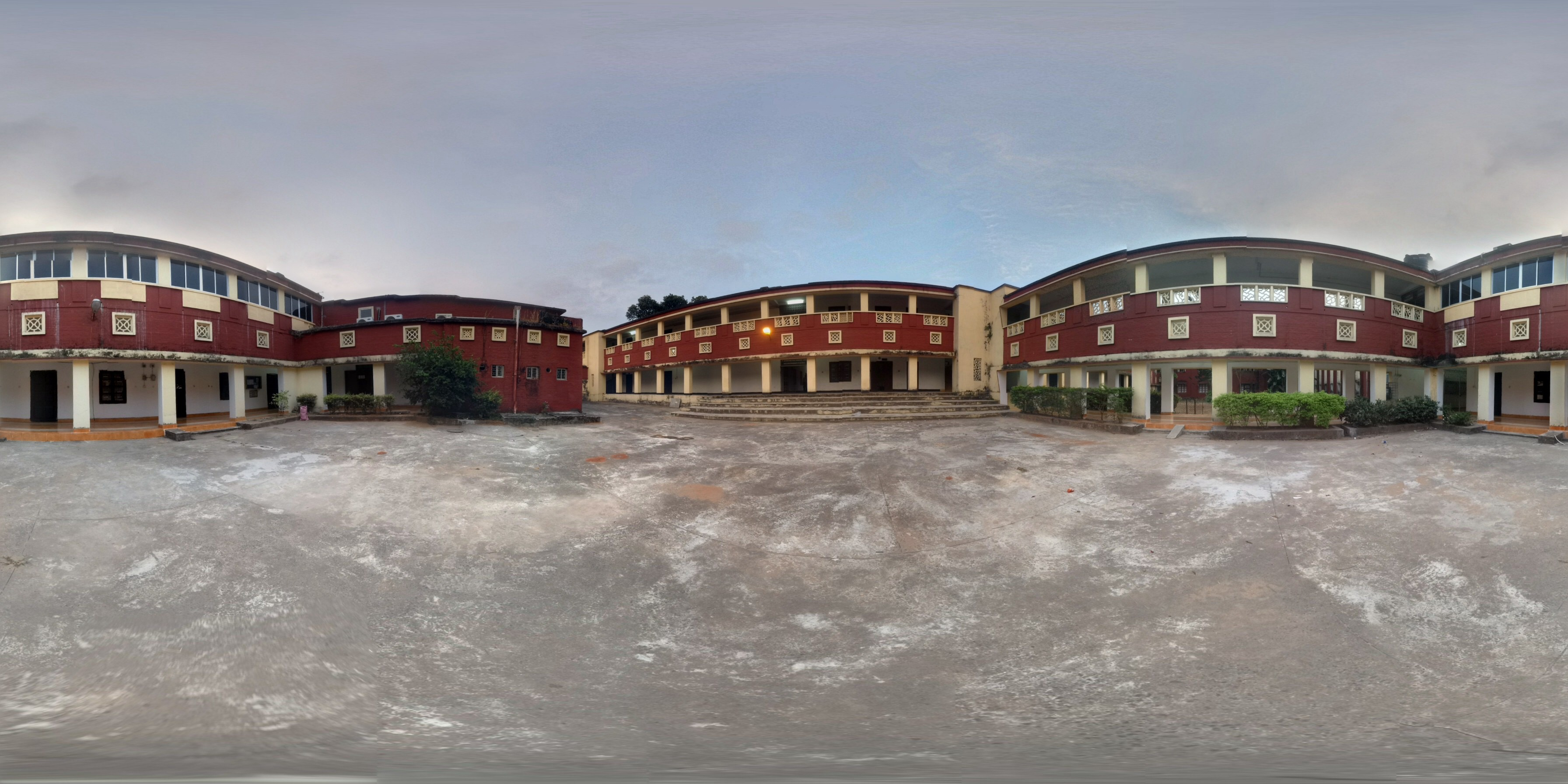
360° photo sphere of Orissa University of Agriculture and Technology

Born 24 November 1967, Manmohan Parida completed his undergraduate studies in veterinary medicine at the Orissa University of Agriculture and Technology in 1993 and post-graduate studies at the Indian Veterinary Research Institute in 1993 before securing a PhD in microbiology from Jiwaji University in 2002. Subsequently, he joined the Defence Research and Development Establishment of the Defence Research and Development Organisation, where he holds the position of Director. His research focus is in the fields of molecular epidemiology of viral infections, epidemics and public health. His studies have been documented by way of a number of articles (Note: Please see Selected bibliography section) and ResearchGate, an online repository of scientific articles has listed 113 of them. Besides, he has contributed chapters to books published by others and has delivered invited lectures. He holds a patent, Oligonucleotides and process for detection of swine flu virus, a process he co-developed with his colleagues at DRDE. The Department of Biotechnology of the Government of India awarded him the National Bioscience Award for Career Development, one of the highest Indian science awards, for his contributions to biosciences, in 2011.

== Selected bibliography ==
- Parida, M. M.; Santhosh, S. R.; Dash, P. K.; Tripathi, N. K.; Lakshmi, V.; Mamidi, N.; Shrivastva, A.; Gupta, N.; Saxena, P. (1 February 2007). "Rapid and Real-Time Detection of Chikungunya Virus by Reverse Transcription Loop-Mediated Isothermal Amplification Assay". Journal of Clinical Microbiology. 45 (2): 351–357. doi:10.1128/jcm.01734-06. ISSN 0095-1137. PMC 1829040. PMID 17135444.
- Parida, M. M.; Upadhyay, C.; Saxena, P.; Dash, P. K.; Jana, A. M.; Seth, P. (2001). "Evaluation of a dipstick ELISA and a rapid immunochromatographic test for diagnosis of Dengue virus infection". Acta Virologica. 45 (5–6): 299–304. ISSN 0001-723X. PMID 12083329.
- SaiRam, M; Ilavazhagan, G; Sharma, S.K; Dhanraj, S.A; Suresh, B; Parida, M.M; Jana, A.M; Devendra, Kumar; Selvamurthy, W (2000). "Anti-microbial activity of a new vaginal contraceptive NIM-76 from neem oil (Azadirachta indica)". Journal of Ethnopharmacology. 71 (3): 377–382. doi:10.1016/s0378-8741(99)00211-1. PMID 10940573.

== See also ==
- Swine flu
- Chikungunya
