= Reciprocal silencing =

Reciprocal silencing, a genetic phenomenon that primarily occurs in plants, refers to the pattern of redundant genes being silenced following a polyploid event. Polyploidy (wholesale genome duplication) is common in plants and constitutes an important method of speciation. When a polyploid species arises, its genome contains homoeologs, duplicated chromosomes with equivalent genetic information. However silencing of redundant genes occurs rapidly in new polyploids through genetic and epigenetic means. This primarily occurs because redundancy allows one of the two genes present for each locus to be silenced without affecting the phenotype of the organism, and thus mutations that eliminate gene expression are much less likely to be deleterious or lethal. This allows mutations that would be lethal in diploid populations to accumulate in polyploids. Reciprocal silencing refers to the specific pattern of silencing where equivalent loci in are both silenced and expressed in a reciprocal manner. This phenomenon is observed on two distinct scales.

== Reciprocal silencing between populations ==
Allopolyploids are species whose increased complement of genetic material is the result of hybridization of two closely related species. Thus homeologous chromosomes in allopolyploids are equivalent, but not identical. These differences mean that the precise pattern of silencing and expression can have important phenotypic effects. Reciprocal silencing on the population level refers to the case where two populations are each descended from the same allopolyploid. In one population, one of the two equivalent loci (A) is expressed while the other (B) has been silenced, while in the other population the reciprocal pattern occurs, with B being expressed and A silenced. This refers to equivalent loci, specific locations within the genome, rather than the entire homeologous chromosome.

Reciprocal silencing on the population level has been proposed as a means of allopatric speciation following a polyploid event. Allopatric speciation occurs when two populations of the same species become spatially separated and accumulate enough genetic differences to lose the ability to interbreed. As redundant genes are silenced in allopolyploids there is the potential for rapid genetic differences to accumulate through reciprocal silencing. These differences can lead to the loss of ability to interbreed between separated populations at a faster rate than other methods of speciation, given the relative speed with which genes are silenced following a polyploid event. Faster still, redundant genes can be silenced through epigenetic means, although the importance of this phenomenon is not fully understood.

== Reciprocal silencing between tissues ==
Reciprocal silencing on the tissue level refers to the same pattern of silencing and expression of homeologous loci. However, in this case, the differences in silencing and expression occur between two types of tissue within the same individual, rather than in individuals of different populations. This is an example of neofunctionalization, a process where duplicated genes that were once at equivalent loci evolve to carry out two separate functions. Since different tissues require different genes to be expressed, reciprocal silencing can occur between tissues. Importantly, while the pattern of gene expression is the same as in the population case, the genetic means by which this pattern is achieved are very different. While silencing mutations are thought to be the main source of reciprocal silencing at the population level, at the tissue level only epigenetic factors are in play, since expressible copies of both homeologous loci must exist in all cells in an individual if different tissues express different homeologs.
