= Mahadji Scindia Sports Complex =

Sports complex in Gwalior, India

Coordinates: 26°12′4″N 78°11′41″E

- Jiwaji University Ground
- Interactive map of Mahadji Scindia Sports Complex
- Full name: Mahadji Scindia Sports Complex
- Location: Gwalior, India
- Owner: Jiwaji University
- Operator: Jiwaji University
- Capacity: 10,000

Mahadji Scindia Sports Complex is a multipurpose sports complex located in Gwalior, Madhya Pradesh, India. The stadium is managed and owned by Jiwaji University.

The stadium has facilities for cricket, football, and hockey. There are also facilities for indoor sports such as basketball, badminton, gymnastics, handball, volleyball, lawn tennis, table tennis, weight lifting, and kabaddi.

The stadium has hosted some non-first-class cricket matches.
