= John Gurdon =

English developmental biologist (1933–2025)

Sir John Gurdon FRS
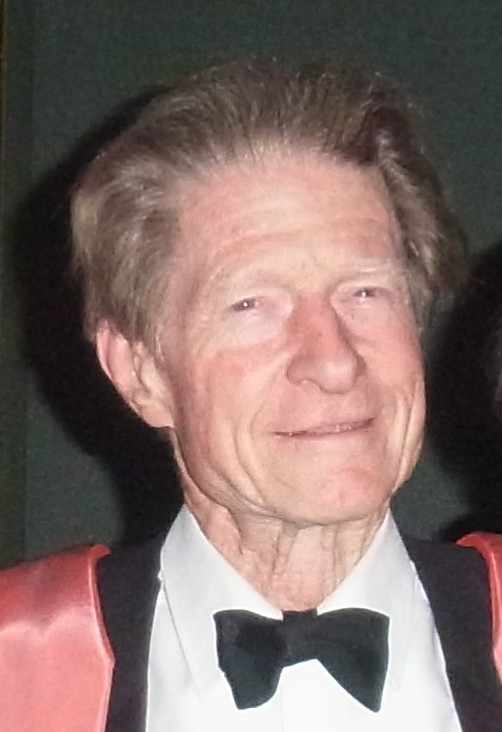
- Gurdon in 2012
- Born: John Bertrand Gurdon; 2 October 1933; Dippenhall, Surrey, England
- Died: 7 October 2025 (aged 92)
- Citizenship: United Kingdom
- Education: Eton College; Christ Church, Oxford (MA, DPhil)
- Known for: Nuclear transfer; cloning
- Awards: Paul Ehrlich and Ludwig Darmstaedter Prize (1977); William Bate Hardy Prize (1984); Royal Medal (1985); International Prize for Biology (1987); Wolf Prize in Medicine (1989); Edwin Grant Conklin Medal (2001); Albert Lasker Basic Medical Research Award (2009); Nobel Prize in Physiology or Medicine (2012)
- Scientific career
- Fields: Developmental biology
- Workplaces: University of Oxford; MRC Laboratory of Molecular Biology; University of Cambridge; California Institute of Technology
- Thesis: Nuclear transplantation in Xenopus (1960)
- Doctoral advisor: Michail Fischberg
- Doctoral students: Douglas A. Melton; Edward M. De Robertis

Sir John Bertrand Gurdon FRS (2 October 1933 – 7 October 2025) was a British developmental biologist, best known for his pioneering research in Cellular differentiation and nuclear transplantation and cloning.

Awarded the Lasker Award in 2009, in 2012, he and Shinya Yamanaka were jointly awarded the Nobel Prize in Physiology or Medicine for the discovery that mature cells can be converted to stem cells.

== Early life and career ==
John Bertrand Gurdon was born on 2 October 1933 in Dippenhall, England, United Kingdom, and grew up in nearby Frensham in Surrey. He attended Frensham Heights Prep school before then attending Edgeborough prep school. He then attended Eton College, where he ranked last of the 250 boys in his year group at biology, and was in the bottom set in every other science subject. A schoolmaster wrote a report stating, "I believe he has ideas about becoming a scientist; on his present showing this is quite ridiculous." Gurdon explains it is the only document he ever framed; he also told a reporter: "When you have problems like an experiment doesn't work, which often happens, it's nice to remind yourself that perhaps after all you are not so good at this job and the schoolmaster may have been right!"

Gurdon went up to Christ Church, Oxford, to read classics then switched to zoology, graduating with an Master of Arts degree. For his DPhil degree he studied nuclear transplantation in a frog species of the genus Xenopus, supervised by Dr Michail Fischberg at Oxford University. After pursuing further postdoctoral work at Caltech, he returned to England where his early posts were in the Department of Zoology at the University of Oxford (1962–71).

Gurdon spent much of his research career at the MRC Laboratory of Molecular Biology and then in the Department of Zoology, where he started working in 1972. He became a professor at the University of Cambridge in 1983. In 1989, he became a founding member of the Wellcome/CRC Institute for Cell Biology and Cancer at Cambridge, which was renamed in his honour in 2004, serving as its chairman until 2001. He served as a member of the Nuffield Council on Bioethics 1991–1995, then Master of Magdalene College, Cambridge, from 1995 to 2002.

== Research ==
A video from an open-access article co-authored by Gurdon: Animal view of different embryos developing in Xenopus laevis eggs: a diploid laevis x laevis is shown on the top, cleaving and entering gastrulation about 50 min earlier than haploid [laevis] x laevis (middle) and [laevis] x tropicalis cybrid (bottom) embryos.

=== Nuclear transfer ===
In 1958, Gurdon, then at the University of Oxford, successfully cloned a frog using intact nuclei from the somatic cells of a Xenopus tadpole. This work was an important extension of work of Briggs and King in 1952 on transplanting nuclei from embryonic blastula cells and the successful induction of polyploidy in the stickleback, Gasterosteus aculatus, in 1956 by Har Swarup reported in Nature. At that time he could not conclusively show that the transplanted nuclei derived from a fully differentiated cell. This was finally shown in 1975 by a group working at the Basel Institute for Immunology in Switzerland. They transplanted a nucleus from an antibody-producing lymphocyte (proof that it was fully differentiated) into an enucleated egg and obtained living tadpoles.

Gurdon's experiments captured the attention of the scientific community as it altered the notion of development and the tools and techniques he developed for nuclear transfer are still used today. The term clone (from the ancient Greek word κλών (klōn, "twig")) had already been in use since the beginning of the 20th century in reference to plants. In 1963 the British biologist J. B. S. Haldane, in describing Gurdon's results, became one of the first to use the word "clone" in reference to animals.

=== Messenger RNA expression ===
Gurdon and colleagues also pioneered the use of Xenopus (genus of highly aquatic frog) eggs and oocytes to translate microinjected messenger RNA molecules, a technique which has been widely used to identify the proteins encoded and to study their function.

=== Later career ===
Gurdon's later research had focused on analysing intercellular signalling factors involved in cell differentiation, and on elucidating the mechanisms involved in reprogramming the nucleus in transplantation experiments, including the role of histone variants, and demethylation of the transplanted DNA.

== Politics and religion ==
Gurdon stated that he was politically "middle of the road", and religiously agnostic because "there is no scientific proof either way". During his time as Master of Magdalene, Gurdon caused some controversy by suggesting that Fellows might occasionally be allowed to deliver "an address on anything they would like to talk about" in college chapel services. In an interview with EWTN.com, Gurdon declared "I'm what you might call liberal-minded. I'm not a Roman Catholic. I'm a Christian, of the Church of England."

== Personal life and death ==
Gurdon married Jean Elizabeth Margaret Curtis, with whom he had two children. He believed himself to be an "anti-intellectual" and hated to read books. He was a keen skier, hiker, squash and tennis player.

Gurdon died on 7 October 2025, five days after his 92nd birthday, with professors from the University of Cambridge and the Gurdon Institute paying tribute.

== Honours and awards ==
Gurdon was elected a Fellow of the Royal Society (FRS) in 1971, and knighted in the 1995 Birthday Honours for "services to Developmental Biology".

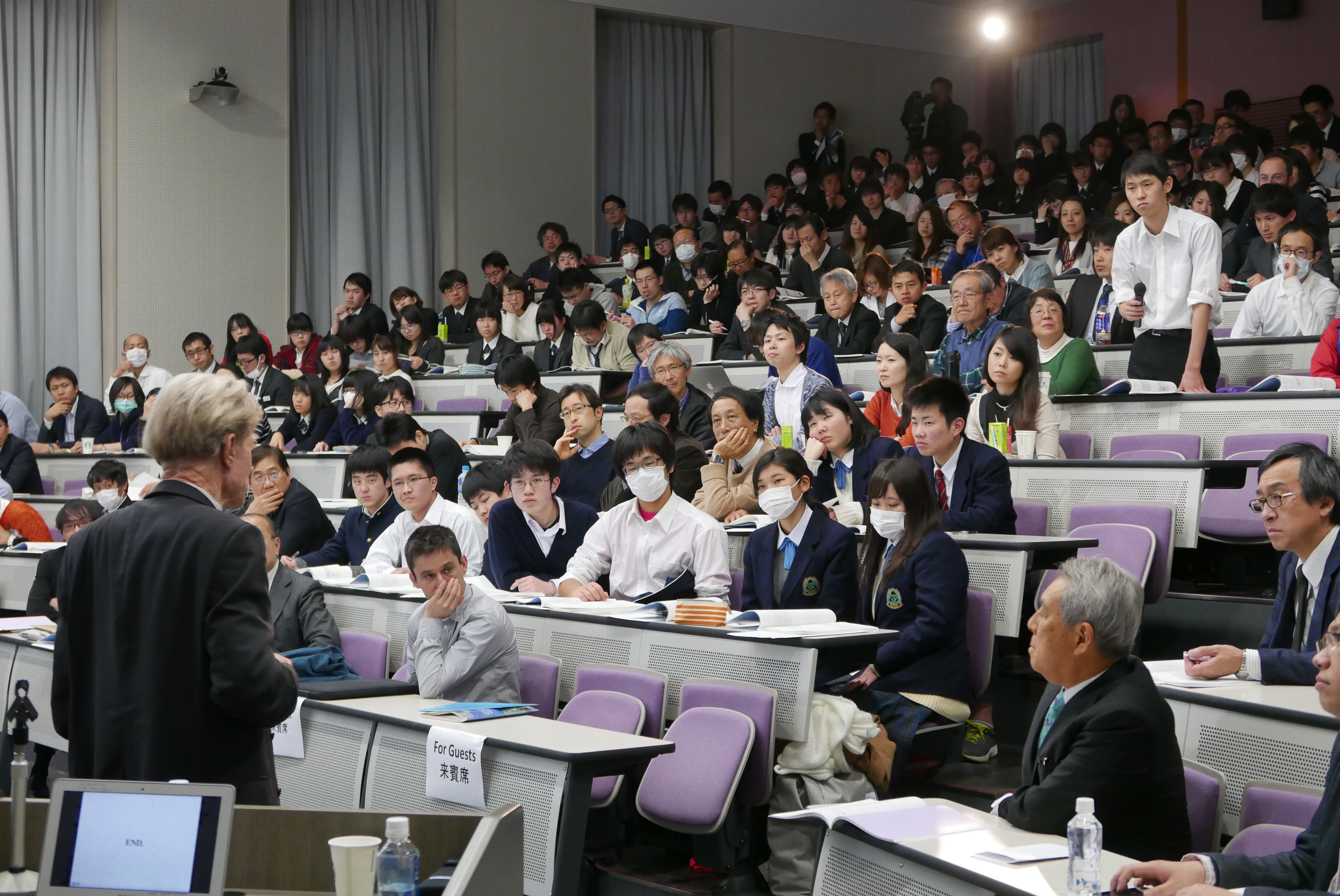
Prof. John Gurdon in University of Yamanashi, Japan, 11, March 2016

He was elected as member to the American Academy of Arts and Sciences in 1978, the United States National Academy of Sciences in 1980, and the American Philosophical Society in 1983, since 2005 he has been an Honorary Member of the American Association of Anatomists. He became a Member of the Academia Europaea (MAE) in 1991.

In 2001, he was awarded the Edwin G. Conklin Medal from the Society for Developmental Biology. In 2004, the Wellcome Trust/Cancer Research UK Institute for Cell Biology and Cancer was renamed the Gurdon Institute in his honour. He was awarded the 2009 Albert Lasker Basic Medical Research Award and in 2014 delivered the Harveian Oration at the Royal College of Physicians. In 2017, Gurdon received the Golden Plate Award of the American Academy of Achievement.

Gurdon was awarded as an Honorary Fellow of the Cambridge Philosophical Society in 2010, of the Academy of Medical Sciences (FMedSci) in 2011, of the Anatomical Society in 2013, the American Association for Cancer Research in 2013, the Royal College of Physicians (Hon FRCP) in 2014, and the Royal Society of Biology (Hon FRSB) in 2015.

He received honorary doctorates including Hon DSc (Oxon) and Hon ScD (Cantab) as well as many other awards and medals.

In 1989 he was awarded the Wolf Prize in Medicine "for his introduction of the xenopus oocyte into molecular biology and his demonstration that the nucleus of a differentiated cell and of the egg differ in expression but not in the content of genetic material".

=== Nobel Prize ===
In 2012, Gurdon was awarded, jointly with Shinya Yamanaka, the Nobel Prize for Physiology or Medicine "for the discovery that mature cells can be reprogrammed to become pluripotent". His Nobel Lecture was called "The Egg and the Nucleus: A Battle for Supremacy".

Academic offices
Preceded by Sir David Chilton Phillips	Fullerian Professor of Physiology; 1985–1991	Succeeded by Dame Anne McLaren
Preceded by Sir David Calcutt	Master of Magdalene College, Cambridge; 1994–2002	Succeeded by Duncan Robinson
