= Har Swarup =

Indian academic (1922-1981)

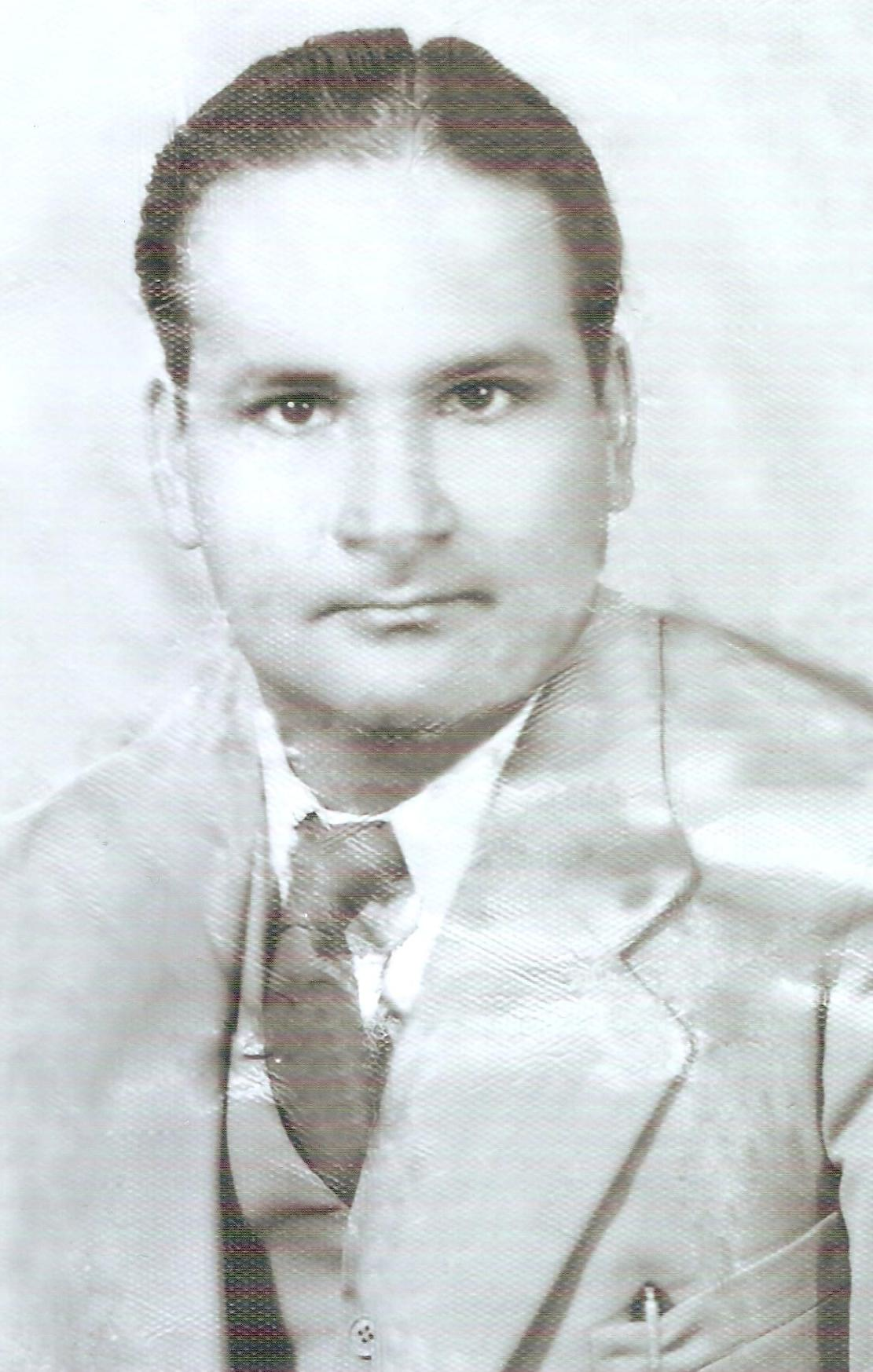
- At Oxford in 1955
- Born: 9 December 1922; Rajgarh, Central Provinces and Berar, British India
- Died: 25 April 1981 (aged 58); Gwalior, India
- Education: Christ Church, Oxford
- Occupation: Scientist
- Known for: Polyploidy, Nuclear transfer, Cloning
- Spouse: Dr Savitri Swarup

Har Swarup, FNA (9 December 1922 – 25 April 1981) was vice-chancellor, academician, and scientist in the field of developmental biology and genetic engineering as well as an academician and teacher of molecular biology and biochemistry. He is known for his research at Oxford University on polyploidy, cloning, nuclear transfer and later for his many other researches such as the discovery of "ringed polysome figures" and on theories on gene expression changes with evolution and environment. In recognition of his contributions, he was awarded the Sir Dorabji Tata Medal, nominated as a fellow of Indian National Science Academy, Honorary Chief Wild Life Warden of the State of Madhya Pradesh and was the vice-chancellor of Jiwaji University, Gwalior until his death.

== Early days and education ==
Har Swarup was born in village Biaora, District Rajgarh in Madhya Pradesh, India in an illustrious family, his father being Late Shyam Behari Lal, a commissioner of taxes in Rajgarh State and grand father the late Devi Prasad, an architect who had in the beginning of the century migrated to central India to design Taj-ul-Masajid (one of the largest mosques in Asia) on a request by Nawab Shah Jahan Begum (1868–1901) ruler of Bhopal. Recognizing his rare brilliance even during his primary education in the pre-independent India, Har Swarup at a young age was sent to Agra and abroad to UK for further studies. He achieved academic distinction in High School Certificate Examination, went on to secure first position both in BSc (1944) and MSc (1946) examinations respectively from Agra University. During his university years, apart from playing first class cricket he actively participated in the freedom movement having met Mahatma Gandhi who influenced him immensely to spearhead the Agra University students movement in the aftermath of the Quit India Resolution at Wardha in 1942. It was again on the advice of Mahatma Gandhi to further the cause of higher education in the country that he joined as a lecturer at D.A.V College in Kanpur in 1946 and subsequently at Sagar in Madhya Pradesh where he completed his doctorate in 1953 while also helping Sir Hari Singh Gaur in setting up the first university of the State at Sagar in Madhya Bharat (now Madhya Pradesh). Har Swarup went to England on a GOI-Rhodes Scholarship in 1955 to be awarded a D Phil at Oxford and opted to return to newly independent India despite several offers abroad, to become one of the youngest university professors in India.

== Researches at Oxford ==
In England he worked with Professor Michael Fischberg for his D Phil at University of Oxford along with John Bertrand Gurdon to do pioneering research on nuclear transplantation and cloning, that now are recognised for potential stem cell and other medical applications. In his path breaking research he could induce successful nuclear transplantation and polyploidy in fish Stickleback, Gasterosteus aculatus, that was reported in the prestigious scientific journal Nature. Prof. John Bertrand Gurdon used the same technique on the frog, Xenopus under Prof Michael Fischberg at Oxford and was later awarded the Nobel Prize in 2012 for the discovery that mature cells can be reprogrammed to become pluripotent. It was the pioneering work to induce polyploidy and the successful cloning of fish and frog respectively by Dr H. Swarup and Dr J. Gurdon using intact nuclei from the somatic cells as an extension of the work of Briggs and King in 1952 on transplanting nuclei from the embryonic blastula cells that was then internationally acclaimed. The British Scientist, Dr. J.B.S. Haldane hailed the work of Dr Har Swarup for its potential medical applications and in describing the results, became one of the first to use the word "clone" in reference to animals. Once Dr. Haldane wrote to Prof. Hickling who was looking for a cytogeneticist that Dr Har Swarup was the best cytogenetist he could get in whole of England. His simple technique for production of polyploidy by hot and cold shock made him so famous that he was invited to demonstrate it at several places like Oxford and Cambridge Universities, and at the then recently set up Marine Biological Station at Plymouth. Sir Ronald Fisher and Professor C.D. Darlington made special mention of Professor Swarup's technique at International Genetical Conference at Oxford to be later invited by Hamburg University, Germany, Tribhuvan University, Nepal and Karachi University, Pakistan. His work opened a new vista for the development of other breakthrough technologies and is widely quoted even today in almost all standard textbooks on biotechnology and genetics.

== Contribution to higher education and research ==
At Sagar University, he started research on fish chondyocranium and harmonics and developed the teaching and research setup based on the Oxford pattern where he was educated. He served at Government College, Nainital on return from University of Oxford, also to receive invitations from the University of Delhi and Benaras Hindu University. However, he opted to develop higher research and the University system in the Madhya Pradesh, the state of his birth, on a call by the then Chief Minister Shri Kailash Nath Katju. To help set up Vikram University, he joined as a university professor at Gwalior in 1961 to later shift to Ujjain where he served in various capacities such as Dean and Emeritus Professor to be appointed as the Vice-Chancellor of Jiwaji University, Gwalior in 1977 where he worked until his sudden death in 1981. While Prof Har Swarup worked with tremendous passion to set up and develop the upcoming Universities of Sagar, Ujjain, Bhopal, Indore and Jabalpur, he contributed to the growth of higher education and research in the country and in setting up of the Association of Indian Universities (AIU), the University Grants Commission, the Indian Council for Cultural Relations (ICCR), the National Academy of Sciences, Council of Scientific and Industrial Research (CSIR) the Indian Science Congress (INSC), where he also served as the sectional President. He published 5 textbooks, over 120 research papers, and several popular articles during a span of barely two decades. With several scores of students who obtained their PhD and DSc under his supervision, his research and interests spanned from developmental morphology, experimental embryology and genetics to endocrinology, molecular biology and environmental sciences. For his research contributions he was nominated for the Fellowship of the National Academy, F.N.A. by the Indian National Science Academy, INSA that posthumously now holds the annual Har Swarup Memorial Awards and Lecture series at New Delhi.

== Publications and achievements ==
Har Swarup focused his attention from descriptive to experimental, and from experimental to molecular biology. His researches in molecular embryology, RNA, DNA, and mitochondria in oogenesis and embryogenesis led him to the discovery of 'ringed polysome figures' and marked alternations in the energy-yielding processes of egg during differentiation. His work in limnology, fish growth and metabolism considerably helped develop fisheries, especially aqua-culture, in India. Dr. Har Swarup occupied more than 50 academic positions in various capacities, to name a few, General Secretary of Zoological Society (1962), Sectional President of Indian Science Congress, Bangalore (1971), Chairman of Indo-American Conference of Biologists (1973), President of Ichthyological Society of India (1979–80). pdf. Founder President of Academy of BioScience (since 1976). Founder President of Vigyan Shodh Bharti (since 1978), President of International Society of Tropical Ecology (1973–76) and Founder President of M.P. Vigyan Academy (1980). He had been the author of English Hindi Biological Glossary of Scientific Terms and been on the Editorial Boards of seventeen scientific journals in India and abroad including BioResearch and the NCERT publications was. He took keen interest in protection of the environment and wildlife as the Honorary Chief Warden of Wildlife for life nominated by the M.P. Government. It was in 1977 that he was appointed as Vice-Chancellor of Jiwaji University, Gwalior where he worked incessantly and with tremendous passion to help set up the Tansen Academy, Family Planning Association of India, the National Adult Literacy Mission and to develop science education and research not only for the state of Madhya Pradesh but for the whole country and to raise these to world standards until his untimely demise on 25 April 1981.
