= Dippenhall =

Hamlet in Surrey, England

Coordinates: 51.213550°N 0.83398°W

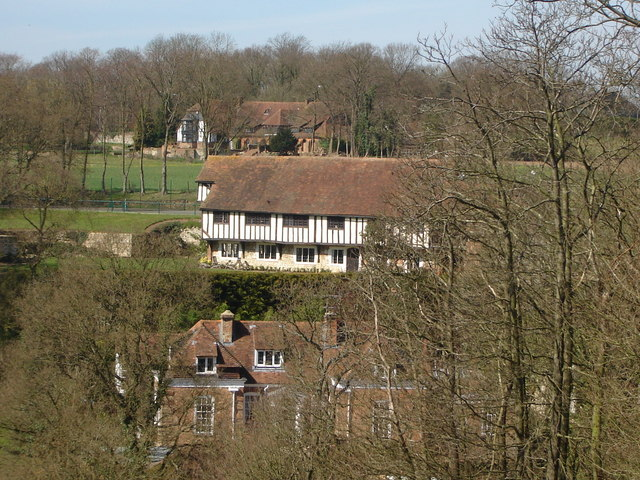

- Location within Surrey
- OS grid reference: SU8154146684
- Civil parish: Farnham
- District: Waverley
- Shire county: Surrey
- Region: South East
- Country: England
- Sovereign state: United Kingdom
- Post town: Farnham
- Postcode district: GU10 5
- Dialling code: 01252
- Police: Surrey
- Fire: Surrey
- Ambulance: South East Coast
- UK Parliament: Farnham and Bordon

Dippenhall is a rural hamlet in the civil parish of Farnham in the Waverley district of Surrey, England. The nearest town, Farnham, is about 1.6 miles (2.6 km) to the east.

== History ==
The manor of Dippenhall was mostly included in the Crondall Hundred and was recognised as a 'tything' owned by Winchester Cathedral until a period of release in the Middle Ages.

In the 14th century Dippenhall (Dupenhale, Dupehale, Dippenhaie, Depenhale, 14th century; Dipnel, seen once in the 18th century in a land tax/ecclesiastical record) appears as a sub-manor dependent on the manor of Crondall – it however followed the same descent as the manor of Badley having parted with Winchester Cathedral until the death of John de Westcote in 1336, when it was assigned to his sister Margery, the wife of John de Fulquardeby. In 1369 Thomas atte More granted back to William Wykeham, Bishop of Winchester, the 'manor of Dippenhall, which he had by grant from Margery de Fulquardeby'. At the Dissolution, Dippenhall, with the other possessions of the Prior and convent of St. Swithun, was granted to the Dean and chapter of Winchester; and from this time it is usually described in leases and other records as the farm of Dippenhall until Page wrote in 1912.

Its 1831 population was 321, when it was described as being in Hampshire. Inclosure occurred in 1848 — this was the privatisation of the common land.

The architect Harold Falkner built Burles Lodge on the edge of the village in the 1930s.

Sir John Gurdon, the 2012 Nobel Prize laureate for Physiology or Medicine, was born in Dippenhall in 1933.

In 1982 the contents of Dippenhall Grange were sold at Sotheby's and a comprehensive guide to these was published.

== Local government ==
Dippenhall is in the civil parish of Farnham.

At Waverley Borough Council, the ward of which Dippenhall is a component is Farnham Castle, served by two councillors. The County Councillor represents "Farnham North".

== Transport ==
The hamlet is centred 1 mile (1.6 km) north of the A31 road between Farnham and Alton and does not pass south of it.
