= Polyploidy =

Condition where cells have more than two sets of chromosomes

This image shows haploid (single), diploid (double), triploid (triple), and tetraploid (quadruple) sets of chromosomes. Triploid and tetraploid chromosomes are examples of polyploidy.

Polyploidy is a condition in which the cells of an organism have more than two paired sets of (homologous) chromosomes. Most species whose cells have nuclei (eukaryotes) are diploid, meaning they have two complete sets of chromosomes, one from each of two parents; each set contains the same number of chromosomes, and the chromosomes are joined in pairs of homologous chromosomes. However, some organisms are polyploid. Polyploidy is especially common in plants. Most eukaryotes have diploid somatic cells, but produce haploid gametes (eggs and sperm) by meiosis. A monoploid has only one set of chromosomes, and the term is usually only applied to cells or organisms that are normally diploid. Males of bees and other Hymenoptera, for example, are monoploid. Unlike animals, plants and multicellular algae have life cycles with two alternating multicellular generations. The gametophyte generation is haploid, and produces gametes by mitosis; the sporophyte generation is diploid and produces spores by meiosis.

Polyploidy is the result of whole-genome duplication during the evolution of species. It may occur due to abnormal cell division, either during mitosis, or more commonly from the failure of chromosomes to separate during meiosis or from the fertilization of an egg by more than one sperm. In addition, it can be induced in plants and cell cultures by some chemicals: the best known is colchicine, which can result in chromosome doubling, though its use may have other less obvious consequences as well. Oryzalin will also double the existing chromosome content.

Whole-organism polyploidy is rare among mammals; however, endopolyploidy (polyploid cells in certain tissues of an otherwise-diploid organism) occurs in mammals at a high frequency in organs such as the brain, liver, heart, and bone marrow. Endopolyploidy also occurs in the somatic cells of other animals, such as goldfish, salmon, and salamanders; and in other Kingdoms.

Polyploidy is common among ferns and flowering plants (see Hibiscus rosa-sinensis), including both wild and cultivated species. Wheat, for example, after millennia of hybridization and modification by humans, has strains that are diploid (two sets of chromosomes), tetraploid (four sets of chromosomes) with the common name of durum or macaroni wheat, and hexaploid (six sets of chromosomes) with the common name of bread wheat. Many agriculturally important plants of the genus Brassica are also tetraploids. Sugarcane can have ploidy levels higher than octaploid.

Polyploidization can be a mechanism of sympatric speciation because polyploids are usually unable to interbreed with their diploid ancestors. An example is the plant Erythranthe peregrina. Sequencing confirmed that this species originated from E. × robertsii, a sterile triploid hybrid between E. guttata and E. lutea, both of which have been introduced and naturalised in the United Kingdom. New populations of E. peregrina arose on the Scottish mainland and the Orkney Islands via genome duplication from local populations of E. × robertsii. Because of a rare genetic mutation, E. peregrina is not sterile.

On the other hand, polyploidization can also be a mechanism for a kind of 'reverse speciation', whereby gene flow is enabled following the polyploidy event, even between lineages that previously experienced no gene flow as diploids. This has been detailed at the genomic level in Arabidopsis arenosa and Arabidopsis lyrata. Each of these species experienced independent autopolyploidy events (within-species polyploidy, described below), which then enabled subsequent interspecies gene flow of adaptive alleles, in this case stabilising each young polyploid lineage. Such polyploidy-enabled adaptive introgression may allow polyploids at act as 'allelic sponges', whereby they accumulate cryptic genomic variation that may be recruited upon encountering later environmental challenges.

== Terminology ==
=== Types ===
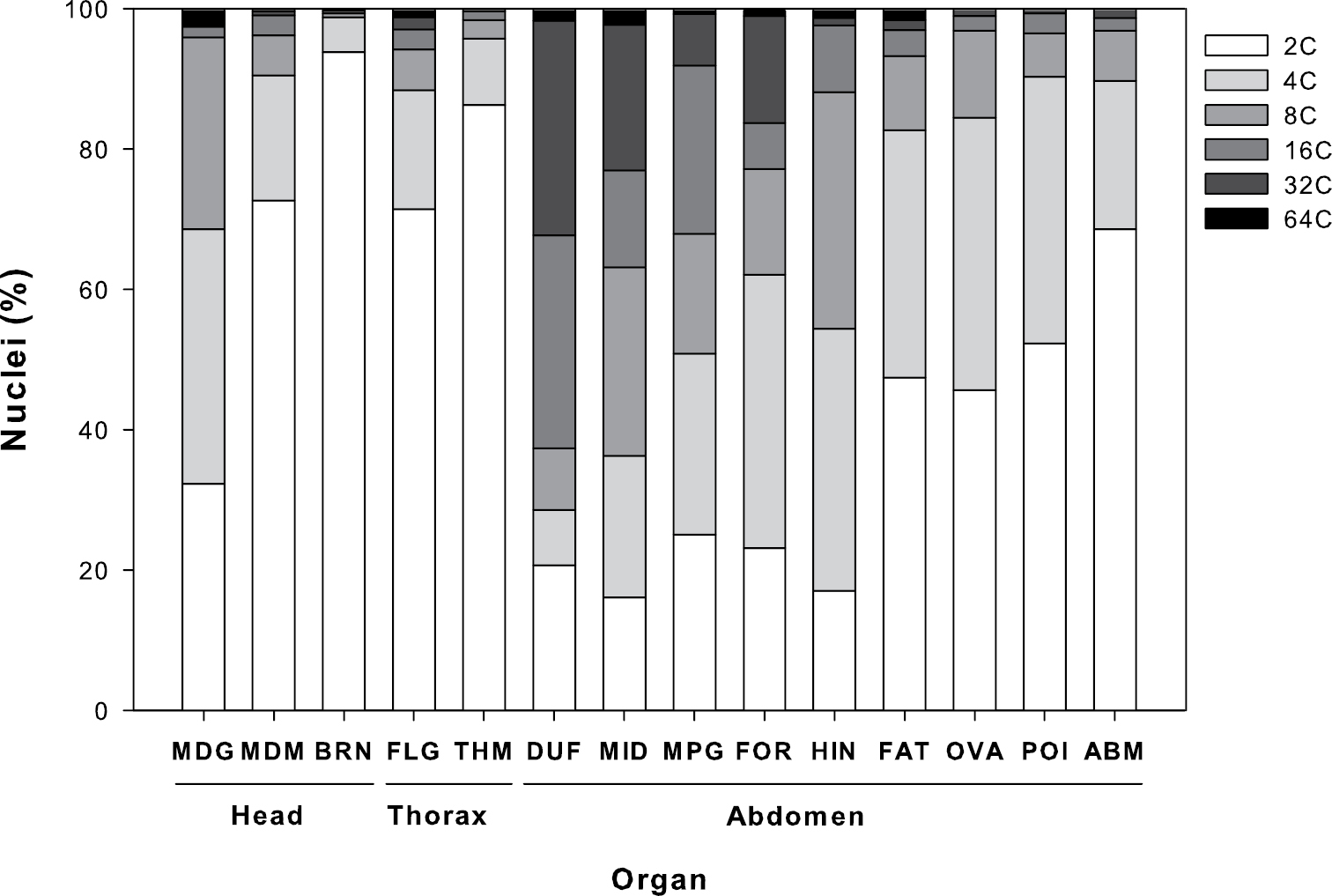
Organ-specific patterns of endopolyploidy (from 2x to 64x) in the giant ant Dinoponera australis

Polyploid types are labeled according to the number of chromosome sets in the nucleus. The letter x is used to represent the number of chromosomes in a single set:

- monoploid (one set; 1x), for example male European fire ants
- diploid (two sets; 2x), for example humans
- triploid (three sets; 3x), for example sterile saffron crocus, or seedless watermelons, also common in the phylum Tardigrada
- tetraploid (four sets; 4x), for example, Plains viscacha rat, Salmonidae fish, the cotton Gossypium hirsutum
- pentaploid (five sets; 5x), for example Kenai Birch (Betula kenaica)
- hexaploid (six sets; 6x), for example some species of wheat, kiwifruit
- heptaploid or septaploid (seven sets; 7x), for example some cultured Siberian sturgeon
- octaploid or octoploid, (eight sets; 8x), for example Acipenser (genus of sturgeon fish), dahlias
- decaploid (ten sets; 10x), for example certain strawberries
- hendecaploid or undecaploid (eleven sets; 11x), for example some Lepidium species and rose cultivars
- dodecaploid or duodecaploid (twelve sets; 12x), for example the plants Celosia argentea and Spartina anglica or the amphibian Xenopus ruwenzoriensis.
- tetratetracontaploid (forty-four sets; 44x), for example black mulberry

The monoploid number x should be distinguished from the haploid number n, which instead describes the number of chromosome sets in a gamete – if one can ever be formed. In a fertile tetraploid (4x) species, there usually is n = 2x: each gamete would be diploid with respect to the monoploid set x, but "haploid" (n) if treating the overall 4x genome as "diploid" (2n). The distinction of monoploid vs. haploid and x vs. n is often overlooked in informal usage.

=== Classification ===
==== Autopolyploidy ====
Autopolyploids are polyploids with multiple chromosome sets derived from a single taxon.

Two examples of natural autopolyploids are the piggyback plant, Tolmiea menzisii and the white sturgeon, Acipenser transmontanum. Most instances of autopolyploidy result from the fusion of unreduced (2n) gametes, which results in either triploid (n + 2n = 3n) or tetraploid (2n + 2n = 4n) offspring. Triploid offspring are typically sterile (as in the phenomenon of triploid block), but in some cases they may produce high proportions of unreduced gametes and thus aid the formation of tetraploids. This pathway to tetraploidy is referred to as the triploid bridge. Triploids may also persist through asexual reproduction. In fact, stable autotriploidy in plants is often associated with apomictic mating systems. In agricultural systems, autotriploidy can result in seedlessness, as in watermelons and bananas. Triploidy is also utilized in salmon and trout farming to induce sterility.

Rarely, autopolyploids arise from spontaneous, somatic genome doubling, which has been observed in apple (Malus domesticus) bud sports. This is also the most common pathway of artificially induced polyploidy, where methods such as protoplast fusion or treatment with colchicine, oryzalin or mitotic inhibitors are used to disrupt normal mitotic division, which results in the production of polyploid cells. This process can be useful in plant breeding, especially when attempting to introgress germplasm across ploidal levels.

Autopolyploids possess at least three homologous chromosome sets, which can lead to high rates of multivalent pairing during meiosis (particularly in recently formed autopolyploids, also known as neopolyploids) and an associated decrease in fertility due to the production of aneuploid gametes. Natural or artificial selection for fertility can quickly stabilize meiosis in autopolyploids by restoring bivalent pairing during meiosis. Rapid adaptive evolution of the meiotic machinery, resulting in reduced levels of multivalents (and therefore stable autopolyploid meiosis) has been documented in Arabidopsis arenosa and Arabidopsis lyrata, with specific adaptive alleles of these species shared between only the evolved polyploids.

The high degree of homology among duplicated chromosomes causes autopolyploids to display polysomic inheritance. This trait is often used as a diagnostic criterion to distinguish autopolyploids from allopolyploids, which commonly display disomic inheritance after they progress past the neopolyploid stage. While most polyploid species are unambiguously characterized as either autopolyploid or allopolyploid, these categories represent the ends of a spectrum of divergence between parental subgenomes. Polyploids that fall between these two extremes, which are often referred to as segmental allopolyploids, may display intermediate levels of polysomic inheritance that vary by locus.

About half of all polyploids are thought to be the result of autopolyploidy, although many factors make this proportion hard to estimate.

==== Allopolyploidy ====
Allopolyploids or amphipolyploids or heteropolyploids are polyploids with chromosomes derived from two or more diverged taxa. They most commonly exhibit disomic inheritance, having functionally diploidized (diploidization).

As in autopolyploidy, this primarily occurs through the fusion of unreduced (2n) gametes, which can take place before or after hybridization. In the former case, unreduced gametes from each diploid taxon – or reduced gametes from two autotetraploid taxa – combine to form allopolyploid offspring. In the latter case, one or more diploid F_{1} hybrids produce unreduced gametes that fuse to form allopolyploid progeny. Hybridization followed by genome duplication may be a more common path to allopolyploidy because F_{1} hybrids between taxa often have relatively high rates of unreduced gamete formation – divergence between the genomes of the two taxa result in abnormal pairing between homoeologous chromosomes or nondisjunction during meiosis. In this case, allopolyploidy can actually restore normal, bivalent meiotic pairing by providing each homoeologous chromosome with its own homologue. If divergence between homoeologous chromosomes is even across the two subgenomes, this can theoretically result in rapid restoration of bivalent pairing and disomic inheritance (diploidization) following allopolyploidization. However, multivalent pairing is common in many recently formed allopolyploids, so it is likely that the majority of meiotic stabilization occurs gradually through selection.

Because pairing between homoeologous chromosomes is rare in established allopolyploids, there often ends up being fixed heterozygosity of homoeologous alleles. In certain cases, such heterozygosity can have beneficial heterotic effects, either in terms of fitness in natural contexts or desirable traits in agricultural contexts. This could partially explain the prevalence of allopolyploidy among crop species. Both bread wheat and triticale are examples of an allopolyploids with six chromosome sets. Cotton, peanut, and quinoa are allotetraploids with multiple origins. In Brassicaceous crops, the Triangle of U describes the relationships between the three common diploid Brassicas (B. oleracea, B. rapa, and B. nigra) and three allotetraploids (B. napus, B. juncea, and B. carinata) derived from hybridization among the diploid species. A similar relationship exists between three diploid species of Tragopogon (T. dubius, T. pratensis, and T. porrifolius) and two allotetraploid species (T. mirus and T. miscellus). Complex patterns of allopolyploid evolution have also been observed in animals, as in the frog genus Xenopus.

==== Aneuploid ====
Organisms in which a particular chromosome, or chromosome segment, is under- or over-represented are said to be aneuploid (from the Greek words meaning "not", "good", and "fold"). Aneuploidy refers to a numerical change in part of the chromosome set, whereas polyploidy refers to a numerical change in the whole set of chromosomes.

==== Endopolyploidy ====
Polyploidy occurs in some tissues of organisms that are otherwise diploid, such as human liver tissues and plant endosperm tissues. This is known as endopolyploidy. Species whose cells do not have nuclei, that is, prokaryotes, may be polyploid, as seen in the large bacterium Epulopiscium fishelsoni. Hence ploidy is defined with respect to a cell.

=== Temporal terms ===
==== Neopolyploidy ====
A polyploid that is newly formed. Examples have an obviously increased genome size, chromosome number, gene copy number, and extant diploid ancestors. They may or may not have undergone initial diploidization to the point that they can have stable diploid-like meiosis and disomic inheritance. The tetraploid hybrids in the Triangle of U as well as common wheat are typical examples: their chromosomes can be easily assigned to separate ancestral sets or "subgenomes".

==== Mesopolyploidy ====
That has become polyploid in more recent history; it is "middle-aged", not as new as a neopolyploid and not as old as a paleopolyploid. Often this refers to an event where diploidization has stabilized to the point of diploid-like meiosis, disomic inheritance, and diploidized genomes up to quasidiploid complements with a very low number of chromosomes; but large, obvious blocks of synteny remain between chromosomes, to the point that they can be detected by surface-level comparative genetics (e.g. all-to-all paralog identification in one species presented as a synteny plot) and/or basic cytogenetic methods such as comparative chromosome painting.

All three diploid Brassica species forming the Triangle of U are mesohexaploid, especially in the context of the two paleo-tetraploidization events of Brassicaceae (shared with Arabidopsis). The same applies to a number of Australian crucifer species. With that said, other sources on this topic do not recognize a distinction between meso- and paleo-polyploidity.

==== Paleopolyploidy ====
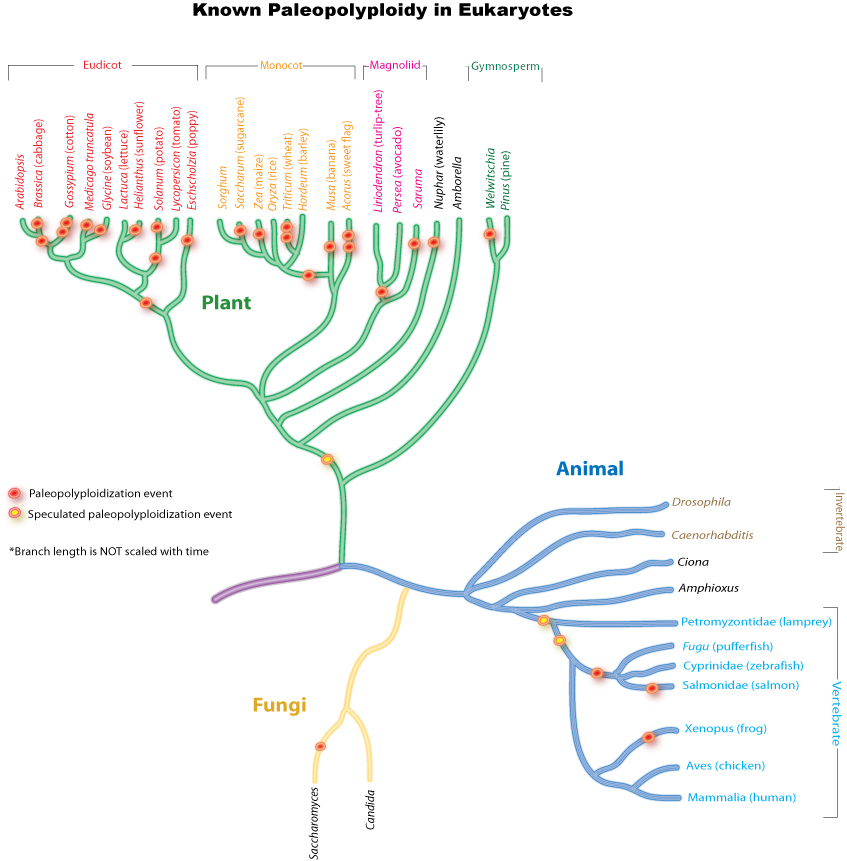
This phylogenetic tree shows the relationship between the best-documented instances of paleopolyploidy in eukaryotes.

In the context of the neo/meso/paleo classification, paleopolyploidy refers to the hardest-to-spot level of ancient polyploidy, where long-term amalgamation of the parental subgenomes hamper the use of simple cytogenetic methods of identification.

Ancient genome duplications probably occurred in the evolutionary history of all life. Duplication events that occurred long ago in the history of various evolutionary lineages can be difficult to detect because of subsequent diploidization (such that a polyploid starts to behave cytogenetically as a diploid over time) as mutations and gene translations gradually make one copy of each chromosome unlike the other copy. Over time, it is also common for duplicated copies of genes to accumulate mutations and become inactive pseudogenes.

In many cases, these events can be inferred only through comparing sequenced genomes. Examples of unexpected but recently confirmed ancient genome duplications include baker's yeast (Saccharomyces cerevisiae), mustard weed/thale cress (Arabidopsis thaliana), rice (Oryza sativa), and two rounds of whole genome duplication (the 2R hypothesis) in an early evolutionary ancestor of the vertebrates (which includes the human lineage) and another near the origin of the teleost fishes. Angiosperms (flowering plants) have paleopolyploidy in their ancestry. All eukaryotes probably have experienced a polyploidy event at some point in their evolutionary history.

=== Other similar terms ===
==== Karyotype ====
A karyotype is the characteristic chromosome complement of a eukaryote species. The preparation and study of karyotypes is part of cytology and, more specifically, cytogenetics.

Although the replication and transcription of DNA is highly standardized in eukaryotes, the same cannot be said for their karyotypes, which are highly variable between species in chromosome number and in detailed organization despite being constructed out of the same macromolecules. In some cases, there is even significant variation within species. This variation provides the basis for a range of studies in what might be called evolutionary cytology.

==== Homoeologous chromosomes ====
Homoeologous chromosomes are those brought together following inter-species hybridization and allopolyploidization, and whose relationship was completely homologous in an ancestral species. For example, durum wheat is the result of the inter-species hybridization of two diploid grass species Triticum urartu and Aegilops speltoides. Both diploid ancestors had two sets of 7 chromosomes, which were similar in terms of size and genes contained on them. Durum wheat contains a hybrid genome with two sets of chromosomes derived from Triticum urartu and two sets of chromosomes derived from Aegilops speltoides. Each chromosome pair derived from the Triticum urartu parent is homoeologous to the opposite chromosome pair derived from the Aegilops speltoides parent, though each chromosome pair unto itself is homologous.

== Examples ==
=== Humans ===
Schematic karyogram of a human, showing the normal diploid (that is, non-polyploid) karyotype. It shows 22 homologous chromosomes, both the female (XX) and male (XY) versions of the sex chromosome (bottom right), as well as the mitochondrial genome (to scale at bottom left).

True polyploidy rarely occurs in humans, although polyploid cells occur in highly differentiated tissue, such as liver parenchyma, heart muscle, placenta and in bone marrow. Aneuploidy is more common.

Polyploidy occurs in humans in the form of triploidy, with 69 chromosomes (sometimes called 69, XXX), and tetraploidy with 92 chromosomes (sometimes called 92, XXXX). Triploidy, usually due to polyspermy, occurs in about 2–3% of all human pregnancies and ~15% of miscarriages. The vast majority of triploid conceptions end as a miscarriage; those that do survive to term typically die shortly after birth. In some cases, survival past birth may be extended if there is mixoploidy with both a diploid and a triploid cell population present. There has been one report of a child surviving to the age of seven months with complete triploidy syndrome. He failed to exhibit normal mental or physical neonatal development, and died from a Pneumocystis carinii infection, which indicates a weak immune system.

Triploidy may be the result of either digyny (the extra haploid set is from the mother) or diandry (the extra haploid set is from the father). Diandry is mostly caused by reduplication of the paternal haploid set from a single sperm, but may also be the consequence of dispermic (two sperm) fertilization of the egg. Digyny is most commonly caused by either failure of one meiotic division during oogenesis leading to a diploid oocyte or failure to extrude one polar body from the oocyte. Diandry appears to predominate among early miscarriages, while digyny predominates among triploid zygotes that survive into the fetal period. However, among early miscarriages, digyny is also more common in those cases less than 8 1/2 weeks gestational age or those in which an embryo is present. There are also two distinct phenotypes in triploid placentas and fetuses that are dependent on the origin of the extra haploid set. In digyny, there is typically an asymmetric poorly grown fetus, with marked adrenal hypoplasia and a very small placenta. In diandry, a partial hydatidiform mole develops. These parent-of-origin effects reflect the effects of genomic imprinting.

Complete tetraploidy is more rarely diagnosed than triploidy, but is observed in 1–2% of early miscarriages. However, some tetraploid cells are commonly found in chromosome analysis at prenatal diagnosis and these are generally considered 'harmless'. It is not clear whether these tetraploid cells simply tend to arise during in vitro cell culture or whether they are also present in placental cells in vivo. There are, at any rate, very few clinical reports of fetuses/infants diagnosed with tetraploidy mosaicism.

Mixoploidy is quite commonly observed in human preimplantation embryos and includes haploid/diploid as well as diploid/tetraploid mixed cell populations. It is unknown whether these embryos fail to implant and are therefore rarely detected in ongoing pregnancies or if there is simply a selective process favoring the diploid cells.

=== Fish ===
Natural polyploidy is quite common in fish; its has been confirmed in Acipenseriformes (sturgeon and paddlefish), Salmoniformes (salmon, trout, and allies), and Catostomidae (North American suckerfish). The most speciose of polyploid fish lineages are members of the Cyprinidae, which encompasses around 400 polyploid species, as well as 30 exclusively polyploid genera.

A polyploidy event occurred within the stem lineage of the teleost fish.

=== Other animals ===
Examples in animals are more common in non-vertebrates such as flatworms, leeches, and brine shrimp. Polyploidy also occurs commonly in amphibians; for example the biomedically important genus Xenopus contains many different species with as many as 12 sets of chromosomes (dodecaploid, 2n = 12x). Polyploid lizards are also quite common. Most are sterile and reproduce by parthenogenesis; others, like Liolaemus chiliensis, maintain sexual reproduction. Polyploid mole salamanders (mostly triploids) are all female and reproduce by kleptogenesis, "stealing" spermatophores from diploid males of related species to trigger egg development but not incorporating the males' DNA into the offspring.

While some tissues of mammals, such as parenchymal liver cells, are polyploid, rare instances of polyploid mammals are known, but most often result in prenatal death. An octodontid rodent of Argentina's harsh desert regions, known as the plains viscacha rat (Tympanoctomys barrerae) has been reported as an exception to this 'rule'. However, careful analysis using chromosome paints shows that there are only two copies of each chromosome in T. barrerae, not the four expected if it were truly a tetraploid. This rodent is not a rat, but kin to guinea pigs and chinchillas. Its "new" diploid (2n) number is 102 and so its cells are roughly twice normal size. Its closest living relation is Octomys mimax, the Andean Viscacha-Rat of the same family, whose 2n = 56. It was therefore surmised that an Octomys-like ancestor produced tetraploid (i.e., 2n = 4x = 112) offspring that were, by virtue of their doubled chromosomes, reproductively isolated from their parents.

Polyploidy was induced in fish by Har Swarup (1956) using a cold-shock treatment of the eggs close to the time of fertilization, which produced triploid embryos that successfully matured. Cold or heat shock has also been shown to result in unreduced amphibian gametes, though this occurs more commonly in eggs than in sperm. John Gurdon (1958) transplanted intact nuclei from somatic cells to produce diploid eggs in the frog, Xenopus (an extension of the work of Briggs and King in 1952) that were able to develop to the tadpole stage. The British scientist J. B. S. Haldane hailed the work for its potential medical applications and, in describing the results, became one of the first to use the word "clone" in reference to animals. Later work by Shinya Yamanaka showed how mature cells can be reprogrammed to become pluripotent, extending the possibilities to non-stem cells. Gurdon and Yamanaka were jointly awarded the Nobel Prize in 2012 for this work.

=== Plants ===
Speciation via polyploidy: A diploid cell undergoes failed meiosis, producing diploid gametes, which self-fertilize to produce a tetraploid zygote.

Polyploidy is frequent in plants, with some estimates suggesting that 30–80% of living plant species are polyploid, and many lineages showing evidence of ancient polyploidy (paleopolyploidy) in their genomes. Huge explosions in angiosperm species diversity appear to have coincided with the timing of ancient genome duplications shared by many species. It has been established that 15% of angiosperm and 31% of fern speciation events are accompanied by ploidy increase.

Polyploid plants can arise spontaneously in nature by several mechanisms, including meiotic or mitotic failures, and fusion of unreduced (2n) gametes. Both autopolyploids (e.g. potato) and allopolyploids (such as canola, wheat and cotton) can be found among both wild and domesticated plant species.

Most polyploids display novel variation or morphologies relative to their parental species, that may contribute to the processes of speciation and eco-niche exploitation. The mechanisms leading to novel variation in newly formed allopolyploids may include gene dosage effects (resulting from more numerous copies of genome content), the reunion of divergent gene regulatory hierarchies, chromosomal rearrangements, and epigenetic remodeling, all of which affect gene content and/or expression levels. Many of these rapid changes may contribute to reproductive isolation and speciation. However, seed generated from interploidy crosses, such as between polyploids and their parent species, usually have aberrant endosperm development which impairs their viability, thus contributing to polyploid speciation. Polyploids may also interbreed with diploids and produce polyploid seeds, as observed in the agamic complexes of Crepis.

Some plants are triploid. As meiosis is disturbed, these plants are sterile, with all plants having the same genetic constitution: Among them, the exclusively vegetatively propagated saffron crocus (Crocus sativus). Also, the extremely rare Tasmanian shrub Lomatia tasmanica is a triploid sterile species.

There are few naturally occurring polyploid conifers. One example is the Coast Redwood Sequoia sempervirens, which is a hexaploid with 66 chromosomes (2n = 6x = 66), although the origin is unclear.

Aquatic plants, especially the Monocotyledons, include a large number of polyploids.

==== Crops ====
An estimated 30% of crops are recent polyploids, with many crops also showing evidence of older duplication events; including strawberry, banana, bread wheat, sugar cane, and broccoli. Most of them are allopolyploids created by deliberate hybridization.

Polyploid crops may be naturally formed, or polyploidy may be induced by environmental, laboratory, or chemical factors (for example by treating seeds with the chemical colchicine). The induction of polyploidy is a common technique to overcome the sterility of a hybrid species during plant breeding. For example, triticale is the hybrid of wheat (Triticum turgidum) and rye (Secale cereale). It combines sought-after characteristics of the parents, but the initial hybrids are sterile. After polyploidization, the hybrid becomes fertile and can thus be further propagated to become triticale.

Some polyploid crops are sterile, especially odd-ploidies like triploidy, and this may be a desirable trait. For example, many seedless fruit varieties are seedless as a result of polyploidy. Such crops are propagated using asexual techniques, such as grafting.

===== Examples =====
- Triploid crops (3n): some apple varieties (such as Belle de Boskoop, Jonagold, Mutsu, Ribston Pippin), banana, citrus, ginger, watermelon, saffron crocus, white pulp of coconut
- Tetraploid crops (2n = 4x): very few apple varieties, durum or macaroni wheat, cotton, potato, canola/rapeseed, leek, tobacco, peanut, kinnow, Pelargonium
- Hexaploid crops (2n = 6x): chrysanthemum, bread wheat, triticale, oat, kiwifruit
- Octaploid crops (2n = 8x): strawberry, dahlia, pansies, sugar cane, oca (Oxalis tuberosa)
- Dodecaploid crops (2n = 12x): some sugar cane hybrids

Some crops are found in a variety of ploidies: tulips and lilies are commonly found as both diploid and triploid; daylilies (Hemerocallis cultivars) are available as either diploid (2x) or tetraploid (2n = 4x); apples and kinnow mandarins can be diploid (2n), triploid (3n), or tetraploid (2n = 4x).

=== Fungi ===
Besides plants and animals, the evolutionary history of various fungal species is dotted by past and recent whole-genome duplication events (see Albertin and Marullo 2012 for review). Several examples of polyploids are known:

- autopolyploid: the aquatic fungi of genus Allomyces (2n = 4x; and 3n), some Saccharomyces cerevisiae strains used in bakery (2n = 4x), etc.
- allopolyploid: the aforementioned Allomyces (2n = 4x), the widespread Cyathus stercoreus (2n = 4x, with some chromosomes showing tetravalent meiosis), the allotetraploid lager yeast Saccharomyces pastorianus (2n = 4x), the allotriploid wine spoilage yeast Dekkera bruxellensis (3n), etc.
- paleopolyploid: the human pathogen Rhizopus oryzae (doubling), the genus Saccharomyces (doubling), etc.

In addition, polyploidy is frequently associated with hybridization and reticulate evolution that appear to be highly prevalent in several fungal taxa. Indeed, homoploid speciation (hybrid speciation without a change in chromosome number) has been evidenced for some fungal species (such as the basidiomycota Microbotryum violaceum).

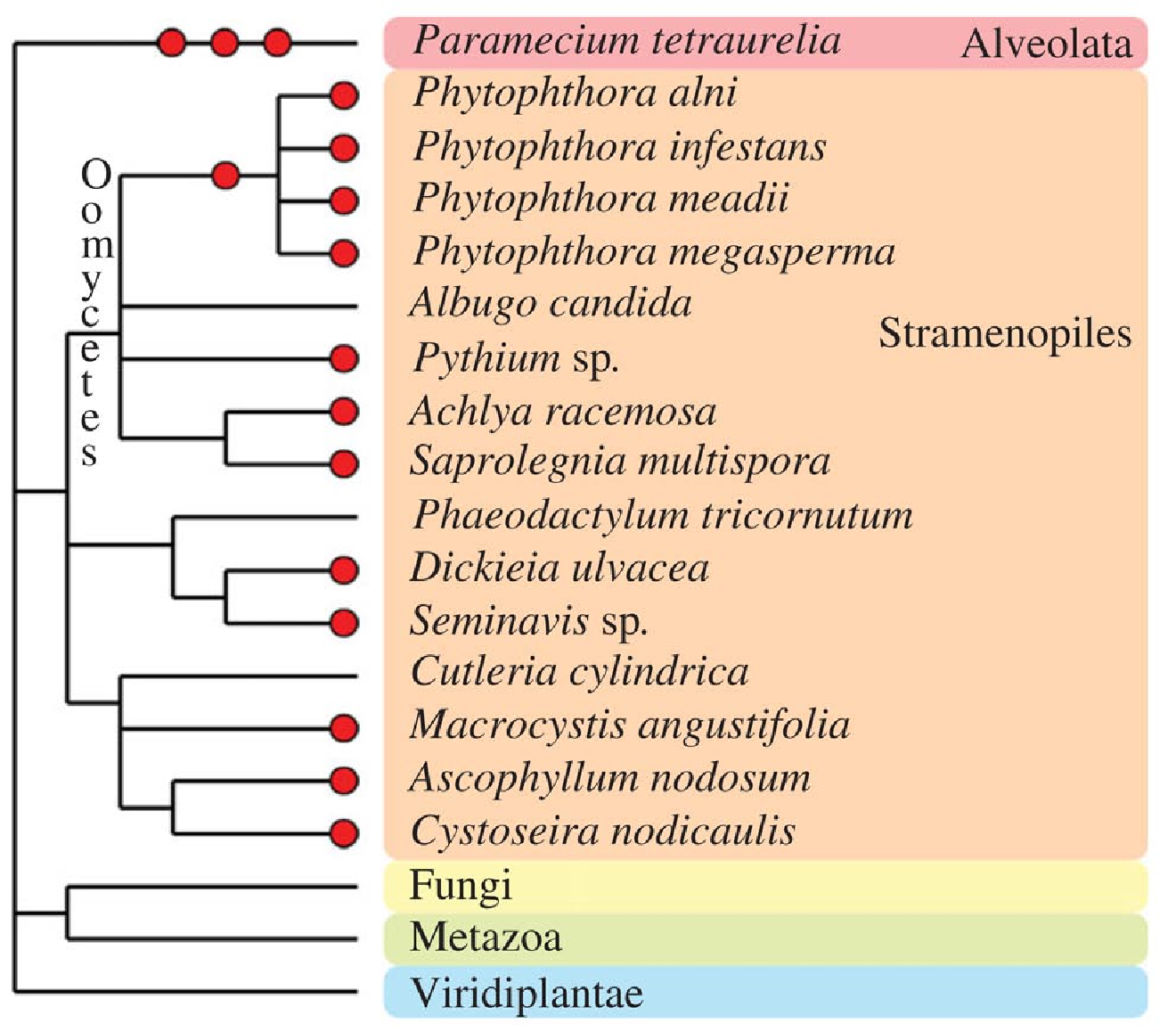
Schematic phylogeny of the Chromalveolata. Red circles indicate polyploidy, blue squares indicate hybridization. From Albertin and Marullo, 2012

As for plants and animals, fungal hybrids and polyploids display structural and functional modifications compared to their progenitors and diploid counterparts. In particular, the structural and functional outcomes of polyploid Saccharomyces genomes strikingly reflect the evolutionary fate of plant polyploid ones. Large chromosomal rearrangements leading to chimeric chromosomes have been described, as well as more punctual genetic modifications such as gene loss. The homoealleles of the allotetraploid yeast S. pastorianus show unequal contribution to the transcriptome. Phenotypic diversification is also observed following polyploidization and/or hybridization in fungi, producing the fuel for natural selection and subsequent adaptation and speciation.

=== Chromalveolata ===
Other eukaryotic taxa have experienced one or more polyploidization events during their evolutionary history (see Albertin and Marullo, 2012 for review). The oomycetes, which are non-true fungi members, contain several examples of paleopolyploid and polyploid species, such as within the genus Phytophthora. Some species of brown algae (Fucales, Laminariales and diatoms) contain apparent polyploid genomes. In the Alveolata group, the remarkable species Paramecium tetraurelia underwent three successive rounds of whole-genome duplication and established itself as a major model for paleopolyploid studies.

=== Bacteria ===
Each Deinococcus radiodurans bacterium contains 4-8 copies of its chromosome. Exposure of D. radiodurans to X-ray irradiation or desiccation can shatter its genomes into hundred of short random fragments. Nevertheless, D. radiodurans is highly resistant to such exposures. The mechanism by which the genome is accurately restored involves RecA-mediated homologous recombination and a process referred to as extended synthesis-dependent strand annealing (SDSA).

Azotobacter vinelandii can contain up to 80 chromosome copies per cell. However, this is only observed in fast-growing cultures, whereas cultures grown in synthetic minimal media are not polyploid.

=== Archaea ===
The archaeon Halobacterium salinarium is polyploid and, like Deinococcus radiodurans, is highly resistant to X-ray irradiation and desiccation, conditions that induce DNA double-strand breaks. Although chromosomes are shattered into many fragments, complete chromosomes can be regenerated by making use of overlapping fragments. The mechanism employs single-stranded DNA binding protein and is likely homologous recombinational repair.

== See also ==
- Diploidization
- Eukaryote hybrid genome
- Ploidy
- Polyploid complex
- Polysomy
- Reciprocal silencing
- Sympatry
