= Defence Research and Development Establishment =

Indian defence laboratory of the Defence Research and Development Organisation (DRDO)

Defence Research & Development Establishment
- Established: 1973
- Director: Dr. Manmohan Parida
- Address: New Campus: Jhansi Road, Gwalior-474 002, Old Campus: Tansen Rd., Gwalior-474 002
- Location: Gwalior, MP
- Operating agency: DRDO
- Website: https://www.drdo.gov.in/labs-and-establishments/defence-research-development-establishment-drde

Defence Research & Development Establishment (DRDE) is an Indian defence laboratory of the Defence Research and Development Organisation (DRDO). Located in Gwalior, it is primarily involved in the research and development of detection and protection against toxic chemical and biological agents. DRDE is organised under the Life Sciences Directorate of DRDO. The present director of DRDE is Dr. Manmohan Parida.

== History ==
In 1924, the Maharaja of Gwalior established a research laboratory to explore forest products and mineral resources. In 1947, the Jiwaji Industrial Research Laboratory (as the lab was known) was inaugurated by C. Rajagopalachari, the then Governor General of India. In 1966, it was taken over by the Ministry of Defence. As its research activities expanded, in 1973, JIRL was made a separate laboratory, and renamed as Defence Research & Development Establishment (DRDE).

Advanced Biological Defence Research Centre (ABDRC) was established, in 2021, under DRDE as a Biosafety level 4 laboratory that will work on highly contagious virus, their effects on human being, and developing safeguards. In 2024, DRDE inaugurated a second Biosafety level 4 laboratory.

== Area of work ==
DRDE is the primary defence laboratory involved in the development of NBC detection and protection systems. It conducts research in the fields of biochemistry, microbiology, biotechnology, virology and toxicology. It conducts safety and toxicological evaluations of hazardous chemicals and materials.

It also develops rapid diagnostic tests for pathogens and investigates preventive measures for the control of diseases. To protect from chemical weapons, it also conducts research in the area of detection, protection and decontamination of hazardous chemicals.

Research and development activities at DRDO cover important demarcated disciplines like aeronautics, rockets and missiles, electronics and instrumentation, combat vehicles, engineering, naval systems, armament technology including explosives research, terrain research, advanced computing, artificial intelligence, robotics, works study, systems analysis and life sciences including high-altitude agriculture, physiology, food technology and nuclear medicine. In addition to undertaking research and development activities, DRDO also assists the Services by rendering technical advice regarding formulation of requirements, evaluation of systems to be acquired, fire and explosive safety and mathematical and statistical analysis of operational problems.

DRDO offers specialised training at its two premier training institutions called Institute of Armament Technology, Pune and Defence Institute of Work Study, Mussoorie. The courses at these institutions have been evolved primarily to meet the needs of DRDO, Department of Defence Production and Supplies and the three Services.

== Projects and Products ==
=== Technologies for Civilian use ===
As a by-product of its research, the lab also develops civilian applications of biotechnology, especially in human waste disposal, disease control, pest control, etc. As is common with DRDO laboratories, many of the technologies developed by DRDE are available for civil use and have been transferred to private sector.

Technologies transferred to the civilian sector include diagnostic kits/systems for Anthrax, Dengue, Plague, Malaria, and other infections. It has also developed insecticides, pest repellents and water quality testing and purification kits. Its major thrust area is defence against Bio-Terrorism, including chemicals agents like Sarin and biological agents like Botulinum neurotoxin.

In 2022, bio-toilets developed by the DRDE began to be installed in Indian Railways' passenger coaches.

== See also ==
- DRDO Young Scientist Laboratories
