= Diploidization =

Change in a genome

Diploidization is the process of converting a polyploid genome back into a diploid one. This can happen both with autopolyploidy due to whole genome duplication (WGD) or allopolyploidy due to hybridization. In any case, the genome instability ("genome shock") acts as an evolutionary pressure to coax the genome back to a (functionally) diploid state, both in terms of gene dosage and in terms of pairing behavior during cell division (especially the relatively delicate meiosis). This is often achieved by losing large segments.

The plant kingdom has undergone multiple events of polyploidization followed by diploidization in both ancient and recent lineages. It has also been hypothesized that vertebrate genomes have gone through two rounds of paleopolyploidy. The mechanisms of diploidization are poorly understood but patterns of chromosomal loss and evolution of novel genes are observed in the process.

== Drive for diploidization ==
Coordinate inter-genomic gene expression
Duplicated genes often result in increased dosage of gene products. Doubled dosages are sometimes lethal to the organism thus the two genome copies must coordinate in a structured fashion to maintain normal nuclear activity. Many mechanisms of diploidization promote this coordination.
Maintain intra-genomic chromosome pairing at meiosis
Chromosome pairing during meiosis is a significant challenge for polyploids. Homoeologous chromosomes with similar genetic content may pair with each other resulting in trivalent or tetravalent interactions. The resolution of these structures results in chromosome breakage, rearrangement, and gamete infertility. Diploidization is often required to restore the cell’s ability to stably go through meiosis.
Reduce costs of maintaining large, duplicated genomes
Large genomes are costly to synthesize during replication and hard to maintain. The loss of duplicated genes during diploidization effectively reduces the overall size of the genome.

== Revolutionary vs. evolutionary changes ==
Once a polyploid is made, either synthetically or naturally, the genome goes through a period of "genome shock". Genome shock can be defined as a stage in which the genome experiences massive reorganization and structural changes to deal with the external stress (X-ray damage, chromosome duplication, etc.) imposed upon the genome. Such changes are termed revolutionary changes and occur early in the process of diploidization. Revolutionary changes ensure that the organism has a stable genome that can be passed to its progeny.

At the end of this process, certain duplicated genes may be preserved thus allowing evolution to shape them into novel functions. This is commonly termed as neofunctionalization. The mechanism of retaining duplicated genes is poorly understood. It has been hypothesized that dosage balance may play a key role in shaping the evolutionary fates of duplicated genes. Evolutionary changes refer to the long process of converting duplicated genes into diverse, functional gene derivatives.

== Mechanisms ==
There are many ways in which a polyploid organism can convert back to a diploid status. This is usually achieved by elimination of duplicated genes. The main goals of diploidization are: (1) To ensure proper gene dosage; and (2) to maintain stable cellular division processes. This process does not need to occur rapidly for all chromosomes in one or few steps. In recent polyploid events, segments of the genome may still remain in a tetraploid status. In other words, diploidization is a long ongoing process that is shaped by both intrinsic and evolutionary drives.

=== Abnormal chromosome pairing ===
Normally, homologous chromosomes pair up in bivalents during meiosis and separate into different daughter cells. However, when multiple copies of similar chromosomes are present in the nucleus, homeologous chromosomes can also pair with homologous chromosomes resulting in the formation of trivalents or multivalents. The formation of multivalents results in unequal division of the chromosomes and lead to daughter cells lacking one or few chromosomes.

=== Illegitimate recombination ===
When homeologous chromosomes pair up though bivalents or multivalents, illegitimate genetic crossovers may occur. Since the chromosomes may differ in genetic structure and content, segments of the chromosome may be shuffled around resulting in massive gene loss. Additionally, illegitimate recombinations may also result in dicentric chromosomes lead to chromosome breakage during anaphase. This further contributes to gene loss on duplicated chromosomes.

== Results ==
=== Elimination of duplicated genes ===
Upon the formation of new polyploids, large sections of DNA are rapidly lost from one genome. The loss of DNA effectively achieves two purposes. First, the eliminated copy restores the normal gene dosage in the diploid organism. Second, the changes in chromosomal genetic structure increase the divergence of the homoeologous chromosomes (similar chromosomes from inter-species hybrid) and promotes homologous chromosome (homologous chromosomes from the same species) pairing. Both are important in terms of adjusting to the induced genome shock.

A slower pathway to weathering the shock in gene dosage is by changing regulatory factors and how they interact with each subgenome (the part descended from one species). For example, the frog Xenopus laevis have most genes remaining as two homeologous copies, but they undergo asymmetric activation in the early embryo. Nevertheless, the total expression level across both subgenomes is broadly conserved compared to zebrafish.

When different subgenomes interact in allopolyploidy, one comes out with few losses while the rest show significant loses. This phenomenon is called fractionation. Fractionation can be used to differentiate allo- from auto-polyploidy events from the past.

=== Evolution of genes to ensure correct chromosome pairing ===
There have been rare events in which genes that ensure proper chromosome pairing have evolved shortly after polyploidization. One such gene, Ph1, exists in hexaploid wheat. These genes keep the two sets of genomes separately by either spatially separating them or giving them a unique chromatin identity to facilitate recognition from its homologous pair. This prevents the need of rapid gene loss to speed up homeologous chromosome diversification.

== Further consequences ==
=== Relaxed selective pressure on duplicated genes ===
The duplicated copies of a gene are commonly non-essential to the plant's ability to maintain normal growth and development. Therefore, one copy is generally free to mutate/be lost from the genome. This contributes to gene loss through the massive chromosome reorganization events during genome shock.

==== Neofunctionalization ====
As mentioned earlier, duplicated genes are under relaxed selective pressure. Thus it may also be subject to neofunctionalization, the process in which a duplicated gene obtains a novel function.

=== Slower processes ===
In mesopolyploidy, normal diploid evolutionary processes subsequent to the stabilization of meiosis by diploidization have fused the chromosomes back into a smaller haploid number (n), and (via losses) the genome size back to a smaller size – more similar to prior to the polyploidization event.

In paleopolyploidy, after the "meso" transitions, further changes to the genome under normal diploid evolution have erased the more obvious large blocks of similarity between the paralogous segments.

== See also ==
- Polyploidy
- Paleopolyploidy
- Neofunctionalization
