= Jiwaji University =

University in Gwalior, Madhya Pradesh, India

- Motto: Sanskrit: Vidhya Praapyate Tejha
- Motto in English: Education brings Aplomb and Glory
- Type: Public
- Established: May 23, 1964; 62 years ago
- Accreditation: NAAC A++
- Affiliations: UGC, BCI, AICET, NAAC
- Chancellor: Governor of Madhya Pradesh
- Vice-Chancellor: Rajkumar Acharya
- Location: Gwalior, Madhya Pradesh, India; 26.202°N 78.197°E
- Campus: Urban
- Website: www.jiwaji.edu

Jiwaji University (JU) is a public collegiate university in Gwalior, Madhya Pradesh, India, previously known as Gwalior University. The name comes from Sir Jiwaijirao Scindia, The Maratha Ruler of Gwalior. The university was established on 23 May 1964 and Sarvepalli Radhakrishnan, the President of India, laid the foundation stone of the campus on 11 December 1964. It is fully accredited by the Government of India.

== History ==
The university started its post-graduate teaching and research from the session 1966–67 with the establishment of Schools of Studies (SOS) in Botany and Zoology. The Schools of Studies in Physics, Chemistry and Ancient History, Culture and Archaeology were started from the session 1969–70. The School of Studies in Economics and Mathematics came into existence in 1978–79.

The School of Studies in Commerce started in 1980–81 and that of Biochemistry from the session 1986-87. The School of Studies in Computer Science, Engineering & Applications started from the session 1995–96 and running MCA and BCA courses. Established in 2000, the Institute of Engineering Jiwaji University is Jiwaji and Rajeev Gandhi Technical University affiliated college of Engineering.

=== Vice chancellors ===
- S. S. Bhandarkar
- R. G. Rajwade
- G. N. Tandon
- Har Swarup
- K. K. Tiwari
- K. K, Singh
- P. S. Bisen
- R. R. Das
- V. P. Saxena
- Satya Prakash
- Mayank Bakna
- Priya Singh Parihar
- D. C. Tiwari
- Hoshiyar Singh
- O. P. Agarwal
- A. K. Kapoor
- Shashi Prabha
- M. Kidwai
- J. N. Gautam
- Sangeeta Sukla

== Affiliated colleges ==
Its jurisdiction extends over 8 districts -Ashoknagar, Bhind, Datia, Guna, Gwalior, Morena, Shivpuri, Sheopur.

== Courses ==
The most special department is SOS in Neuroscience which conducts India's only Department of Biotechnology-sponsored neuroscience teaching program at the university level. It was started by the Department of Biotechnology, New Delhi and has many projects in collaboration with CSIR, ICMR, DBT, DST, DRDO and UGC labs and R&D. There are 10 seats per year and the meritorious students are provided with Rs, 5,000 monthly DBT studentship.

JU started an MBA course under the School of Studies in Commerce from the session 1987. School of Studies in Library and Information Science was established in 1986 and School of Studies in Earth Science in 1991. The university established a centre of foreign language in 1986, which offers diploma and certificate courses in English, French, German and Russian. The Indira Gandhi Academy of Environment Education, on interdisciplinary programmes of environment and Ecoplanning was established in 1989. A centre for M. Phil Studies in Sociology and Political Science was established in 1990. The Institute of Engineering, the technical education centre of university, started in 2000. Most of the students of the institute are working in MNCs like L&T Infotech, IBM, Patni, Accenture, Microsoft, and Google.

The schools are around the central administrative block, leading to close relation between the university and the associated schools

== Notable alumni ==
- Umesh Varshney, Molecular biologist and Shanti Swarup Bhatnagar laureate
- Manmohan Parida, virologist, N-Bios laureate
- Narendra Singh Tomar, politician, speaker of Madhya Pradesh Legislative Assembly, former cabinet minister of Government of India
- Rajinder Garg, horticulturalist and politician
- Abhay Karandikar, Secretary to the Department of Science and Technology, educator, innovator, engineer

== See also ==
- Mahadji Scindia Sports Complex
