= Hybrizyme =

Hybrizyme is a term coined to indicate novel or normally rare gene variants (or alleles) that are associated with hybrid zones, geographic areas where two related taxa (e.g. species or subspecies) meet, mate, and produce hybrid offspring. The hybrizyme phenomenon is widespread and these alleles occur commonly, if not in all hybrid zones. Initially considered to be caused by elevated rates of mutation in hybrids, the most probable hypothesis infers that they are the result of negative (purifying) selection. Namely, in the center of the hybrid zone, negative selection purges alleles against hybrid disadvantage (e.g. hybrid inviability or infertility). Stated differently, any allele that will decrease reproductive isolation is favored and any linked alleles (genetic markers) also increase their frequency by genetic hitchhiking. If the linked alleles used to be rare variants in the parental taxa, they will become more common in the area where the hybrids are formed.

== Etymology ==
Originally hybrizymes were defined as "unexpected allelic electromorphs associated with hybrid zones", a formal term proposed by renowned conservation geneticist and biogeographer David S. Woodruff in 1988. By suggesting a new definition for a phenomenon that had been previously widely observed Woodruff's interpretation bypasses the etiological connotation of alternative terms and avoids inappropriate context. Namely, previous studies referred to allozymes that were observed at high frequency in hybrid zones, but are absent or rare in parental taxa as "the rare allele phenomenon". These alleles can have increased frequencies up to a point of the allele becoming the most common one in the hybrid zone, rendering the term "the rare allele phenomenon" deceptive. Despite this, these two terms have been used interchangeably in literature.

== Widespread phenomenon ==
Hybrid populations display the hybrizyme phenomenon by having increased frequencies of certain alleles that are rare or non-existent outside of the hybrid zone. The hybrizyme phenomenon is widespread in hybrid zones of species of snails, crickets, lizards, salamanders, rodents, fish and birds. Intriguingly, the increased frequency of some of these alleles can have a pronounced effect making them 3-20 times more common in hybrids than in non-hybrid populations.

Early studies focused on detecting electromorphs for loci that code regulatory and non-regulatory enzymes from several functional classes using allozyme electrophoresis and usually involved loci that were polymorphic in parental populations. The phenomenon has also been detected in a broad range of genetic markers such as intron haplotypes, microsatellites, ribosomal DNA spacer variants, and anonymous SNPs.

== Mutational origin ==
Multiple hypotheses have been proposed to explain the mutational (molecular) origin of hybrizymes. They include gene conversion, transposable element activity, post-translational modification, mutations. and intragenic recombination. Some of these hypotheses are rejected by research in the past couple of years, but there is an unambiguous explanation for the mutational origin of hybrizymes. The two hypotheses most often discussed are increased mutation rates and intragenic recombination.

=== Mutation ===
Under the mutational hypothesis, hybrizymes likely arise due to simple point mutations. Sequencing data have indicated this and imply low likelihood that hybrizymes arise as a result of transposition or recombination. Research on pocket gophers and Japanese freshwater crabs confirms that the phenomenon is possibly caused by simple nucleotide substitutions. However, the hypothesis has several weaknesses. It does not explain why normally rare alleles are restricted to a hybrid zone, why polymorphic loci are affected more or offers a mechanism that explains the high frequency of even the rarest variants.

=== Intragenic recombination ===
Intragenic recombination, under certain circumstances, might create new allelic variants at rates higher than the ones associated with regular mutational processes. Under this hypothesis the variant allele would be a mosaic of the parental alleles. The likelihood of this hypothesis was disputed, through sequencing studies. Although there is yet no specific explanation for hybrizymes, it is not excluded that hybrizymes are generated by the combined effect of recombination and mutation events, with any recombination trace concealed by succeeding mutations. However, research on Acer species implies that high recombination rates are possible due to acceleration of genetic variation after hybridization. Furthermore, results are found that indicate that recurrent mutation is unlikely and that support the hypothesis of recombination.

== Cause of maintenance ==
Several hypotheses have been proposed to account the high frequency of hybrizymes in hybrid zones such as genetic drift, elevated rates of nucleotide substitutions. or positive selection on alleles which are mildly deleterious in parental taxa. Still, some faced a certain degree of unpredictability; specifically under the mutational hypothesis the overall substitution rates are elevated and many variants are expected versus having only one allele reaching high frequency and, at the same time, positive selection on deleterious alleles seems ambiguous.

Selection does not need to be directed to the hybrizyme, but to other genes with which the hybrizyme is linked, placing genetic hitchhiking in perspective. In other words, hybrid zones are maintained primarily by balance between gene flow and hybrid inferiority. In the centre of hybrid zones, the process of constant creation of low-fitness recombinant genotypes will favor any allele that will decrease reproductive isolation, consequently elevating the hybrid fitness. So, a likely mechanism would be negative or purifying selection against poorly fit multilocus genotypes. Therefore, the hybrizymes that increase in frequency could be modifier alleles or genetic markers that increase via hitchhiking. It is not excluded that the targets of selection are the barrier loci, loci that resist homogenization with the other genome during gene flow among diverging species, making them the most different parts of the genome between divergent populations.

If allelic variation at these loci is considered, there might be alleles that have differential effect on reproductive isolation or hybrid disadvantage, leading to selection of those who have lower severity. The exact origin and mechanism that maintains these alleles at a high frequency is still a subject of debate and additional studies, such as Next Generation Sequencing analysis of the genomic regions involved in the phenomenon as a more trustworthy pathway to identify genes that impact the level of reproductive isolation.

== Adaptive novelty ==
Hybridization might expand the prospect of adaptive radiation to the point where positive selection on recombinant hybrid genotypes surpasses the intrinsic selection against them. Therefore, the selection schemes in hybrid swarms ensures that relatively strong endogenous selection would not quench such potential. Additionally, partial postzygotic reproductive isolation usually involves multiple genes and segregation and recombination of genes creates broadly varying reproductive compatibility in hybrid populations. Consequently, there will be recurrent removal of disadvantageous alleles for reproductive isolation and relative stabilization of hybrid zones, possibly slowing down the path of complete speciation by reinforcement.

With the continual selection against hybrid disadvantage, crossing-over might, over time, interrupt existing linkages and establish new. This generates a shift in selection pressure on loci which are in linkage with these genes and will contribute to further changes in allele frequencies on a genome scale. The "rare allele phenomenon" might be an indication of this process. Even with the continuous effect of relatively strong endogenous selection against hybrids, a hybrid population might be an example where selection against reproductive isolation results in creating variable recombinant genotypes. Sometimes, this phenomenon might assist in creating a complex of adaptive traits that lead to adaptive novelty.
