= Hybrid zone =

Population genetics term

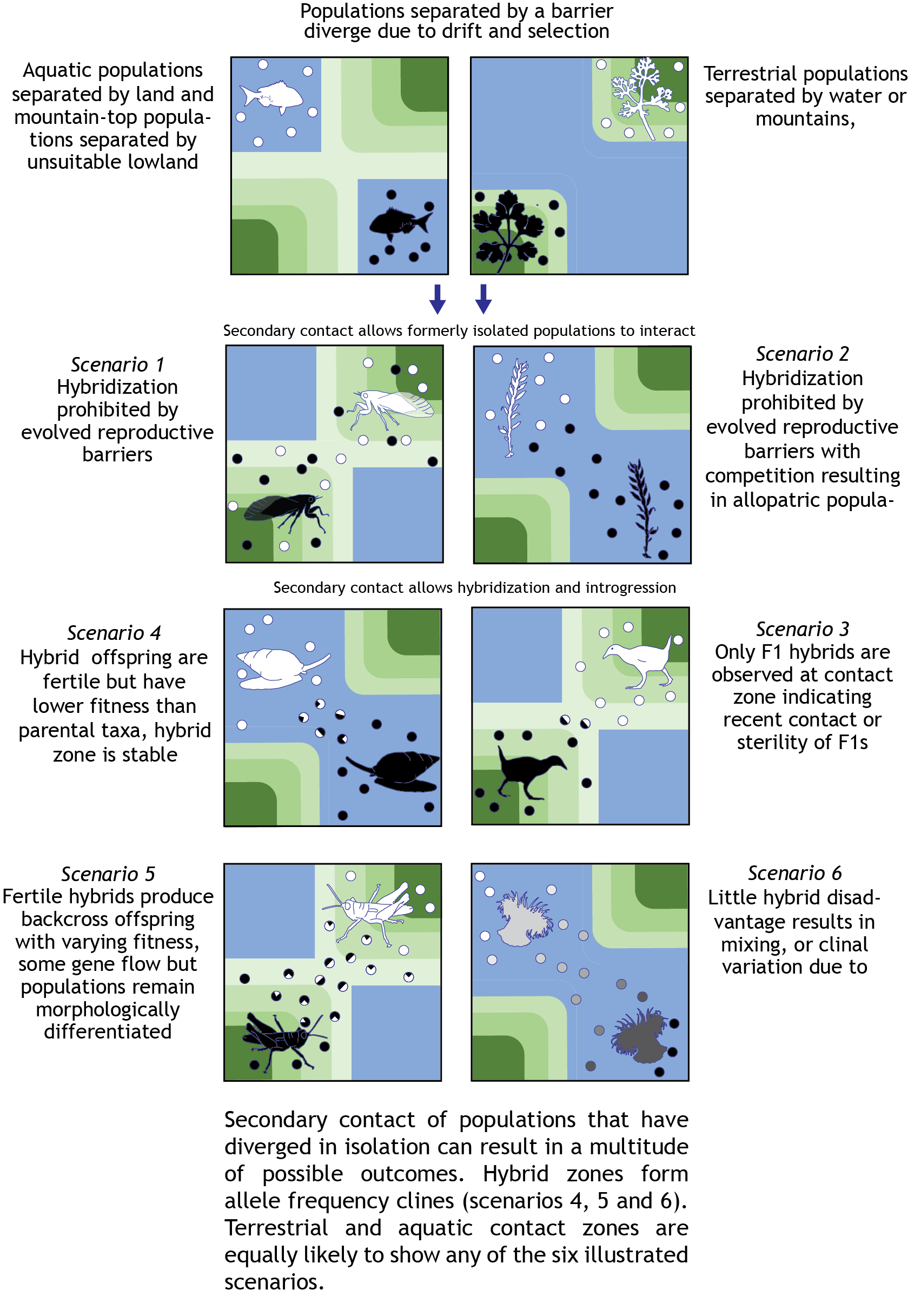
Hybrid zones can form from secondary contact

A hybrid zone exists where two species or diverged intraspecific lineages admix continuously but incompletely, maintaining the genetic integrity of both original populations as well as continuously producing hybrids who segregate into their own population. Hybrid zones can form in situ due to the evolution of a new lineage, but generally they result from secondary contact of the parental forms after a period of geographic isolation, which allowed their differentiation. Hybrid zones are useful in studying the genetics of speciation as they can provide natural examples of differentiation and gene flow between populations that are at some point on the continuum between diverging populations and separate species with reproductive isolation.

== Definition ==
Hybrid zones are areas where the hybrid offspring of two divergent taxa (species, subspecies or genetic "forms") are prevalent and there is a cline in the genetic composition of populations from one taxon to the other. The two (or more) genetically differentiated species or lineages contributing to formation of a hybrid zone are regarded as parental forms. Precise definitions of hybrid zones vary; some insist on increased variability of fitness within the zone, others that hybrids be identifiably different from parental forms and others that they represent secondary contact alone. The widths of such zones can vary from tens of metres to hundreds of kilometres. The shape of the zones (clines) can be gradual or stepped. Additionally, hybrid zones may be ephemeral or long-lasting.

Some hybrid zones can be seen as presenting a paradox for the biological definition of a species, usually given as "a population of actually or potentially interbreeding individuals that produce fertile offspring" under what has become known as the Biological Species Concept. Under this definition, both parental forms could be argued to be the same species if they produce fertile offspring at least some of the time. However, the two parental populations or species often remain identifiably distinct, conforming to an alternative, and presently preferred concept of species as "taxa that retain their identity despite gene flow".

The clines of hybrid zones can be observed by recording the frequency of certain diagnostic alleles or phenotypic characteristics for either population along a transect between the two parental populations or species. Often the clines take the form of a sigmoidal curve. They can be wide (gradual) or narrow (steep) depending on the ratio of hybrid survival to recombination of genes. Hybrid zones which show no regular transition from one taxon to the other, but rather a patchy distribution of parental forms and subpopulations with hybrid background, are termed mosaic hybrid zones.

== Models and theories ==
Various models and theories have been developed by the researchers of hybrid zones. Major models can be largely categorized into four types: ephemeral hybrid zone theory, bounded hybrid superiority model, mosaic hybrid zone model and tension zone model. In each model, different evolutionary forces are attributed different levels of importance. The different models result largely from the study of different biological material (natural populations). The four major models operate mostly under a general framework of either a balance between natural selection and dispersal or interaction between genotypes and environment. Different hybrid zones may fit different models and no single theory or model serves to explain all the hybrid zones found in nature.

=== Ephemeral hybrid zone theory ===
Some early evolutionary biologists who preferred a biological species concept, such as Ernst Mayr and Theodosius Dobzhansky, believed that hybrid zones are generally rare and ephemeral, with an eventual fate of either merging of the hybridizing populations or reinforcement, which leads to a speciation event. The extinction of one of the hybridizing populations through introgression is sometimes termed "waves of advance". (Although this term can also refer to the spreading of advantageous allele across a reproductive barrier) The ephemerality of hybrid zone has been countered by the discovery of many hybrid zones that has lasted for a long period of time, up to 100,000 years found between the iguanid lizards, Sceloporus woodi and S. undulatus undulatus.

=== Bounded hybrid superiority ===
The bounded hybrid superiority model predicts that hybrids have higher fitness in a habitat that is intermediate between those of their parental populations. The hybrid habitat occurs usually, but not necessarily, on a narrow ecotone. Clines of a bounded hybrid superiority zone reflect a smooth gradient corresponding to the gradient of differential selection strength in fitness-related characteristics. The bounded superiority model places a high importance on the ecological aspect of the habitat. In fact, botanist Edgar Anderson suggested that hybrid populations are more likely to inhabit ecologically disturbed areas, which often occur under human’s modification of landscapes or geological events that create novel habitat conditions. He argued that hybrid zones are essentially formed via "hybridization of habitats". Anderson also considered natural hybridization as a positive evolutionary stimulus that allows different populations and lineages to exchange adaptive genetic elements—similar view that place a high evolutionary importance on hybrid zones is more prevalent among botanists, in contrast to zoologists who are more likely see hybrid zones as more of a "natural laboratory" of population genetics. Some criticism for the bounded superiority model suggests that hybrid zones with higher hybrid fitness are theoretically unlikely to be distributed along narrow ecotones; some also point out that there has not been direct empirical evidence of higher hybrid fitness along an ecological gradient (i.e. ecotones).

=== Tension zone model ===
The term tension zone was first used by K. H. L. Key to describe an area of hybridizing populations that act like a "semipermeable membrane" in terms of gene exchange. This term was later taken by Nicholas Barton and Godfrey Hewitt to denote a hybrid zone maintained by a balance between selection and dispersal. Similar models have also previously been termed dynamic equilibrium.

A tension zone is characterized by a dispersal-dependent cline (in contrast to a dispersal-independent cline such as a bounded hybrid superiority zone) maintained between the "homogenizing effect" of dispersal and some forces of "spatial heterogeneity", such as differential selection and introgression. Whether a hybrid zone is a tension zone or not is determined by the characteristic scale of selection, l = σ/√s, where σ^{2} is dispersal rate and s is selection strength. The width w of a dispersal-dependent cline is of the same order as l, whereas a dispersal-independent cline has a much greater w than l. As the hybrids in a tension zone model often exhibit lower fitness compared to the parentals, a "hybrid sink" is maintained through parental gene flow into the tension zone, but rarely hybrid gene flow outwards.

Although tension zones can be restricted by natural barriers to gene flow, they are generally considered to be environment-independent. Therefore, the movement of a tension zone can be described independent of ecological characteristics of the habitat. A tension zone can move geographically by mainly three kinds of forces– the fitness variation among individuals of a population, variation in density or dispersal rate, and gene frequencies that may lead to change in density or dispersal.

=== Mosaic hybrid zone model ===
A mosaic hybrid zone is characterized by a "patchy" distribution of genotype frequencies. Richard Harrison suggested that in some hybrid zones the patterns of environmental heterogeneity can be more complex than can be accounted for by a gradient model, as the transition between two environments may not be a continuous gradient but rather a mosaic distribution comprising patches of varying proportions of the two environments. A hybrid zone demonstrating a mosaic distribution can be hard to detect. If a transect is taken on a mosaic zone, the distribution of a genotypic trait may present itself as a wave with multiple peaks or plateaus, which may be interpreted as clines depending on the size of the geographical study. The detection of patchy distribution depends on whether the mosaic zone is "fine-grained" or "coarse-grained", i.e. the comparative size of the dispersal distance and the average size of a patch.

=== Primary and secondary hybrid zone ===
Hybrid zones can be either primary or secondary. Primary hybrid zones occur where divergence is taking place between adjacent populations of a previously homogeneous species, possibly leading to parapatric speciation. As a population spreads across a contiguous area it may spread into an abruptly different environment. Through adaptation to the new environment, the adjacent populations begin parapatric divergence. The point of contact between the older population and the newer population is ideally a stepped cline, but due to dispersal across the line, hybridization takes place and a hybrid zone arises. Secondary hybrid zones in turn arise from secondary contact between two populations that were previously allopatric. In practice it can be quite difficult to distinguish between primary and secondary contact by observing an existing hybrid zone. Most of the prominent, recognized hybrid zones are thought to be secondary.

One form of hybrid zone results where one species has undergone allopatric speciation and the two new populations regain contact after a period of geographic isolation. The two populations then mate within an area of contact, producing 'hybrids' which contain a mixture of the alleles distinctive for each population. Thus novel genes flow from either side into the hybrid zone. Genes can also flow back into the distinct populations through interbreeding between hybrids and parental (non-hybrid) individuals (introgression). These processes lead to the formation of a cline between the two pure forms within the hybrid zone. In the centre of such a cline, hybrizymes are commonly found. These are alleles that are normally rare in both species but, probably due to genetic hitchhiking on genes for hybrid fitness, reach high frequencies in the areas where most hybrids are formed.

== Hybrid zone in conservation biology ==
Hybrid zones involving a rare species and a more common one can be at risk for outbreeding depression that reduces the fitness of the rare species. Another risk that can arise is the assimilation of the rare species through loss of rare genotypes or phenotypes. This risk is especially high when an invasive species hybridizes with an endemic species on an island. However, hybridization can also serve to introduce genetic diversity into small, inbred populations, such as the case with the Florida panther. In this respect, conservation policies based on taxa instead of genetic structure can be disadvantageous to rare species experiencing inbreeding depression.

Hybrid subpopulations formed through sympatric or parapatric speciation at the geographical periphery of larger populations can be important targets for conservation, as they may be sites of future speciation events that lead to higher biodiversity.

Hybrid zones can be a good indicator in the study of climate change. Monitoring the range of hybrid zones through genetic methods such as geographical cline analysis of genotype distribution can tell us the populations’ response to historical as well as ongoing changing environments. Examining the exchange of adaptive alleles or genomic regions can also be useful in mapping the populations’ adaptation to climatic niches.

== Case studies ==
=== Marine hybrid zone: blue mussels ===
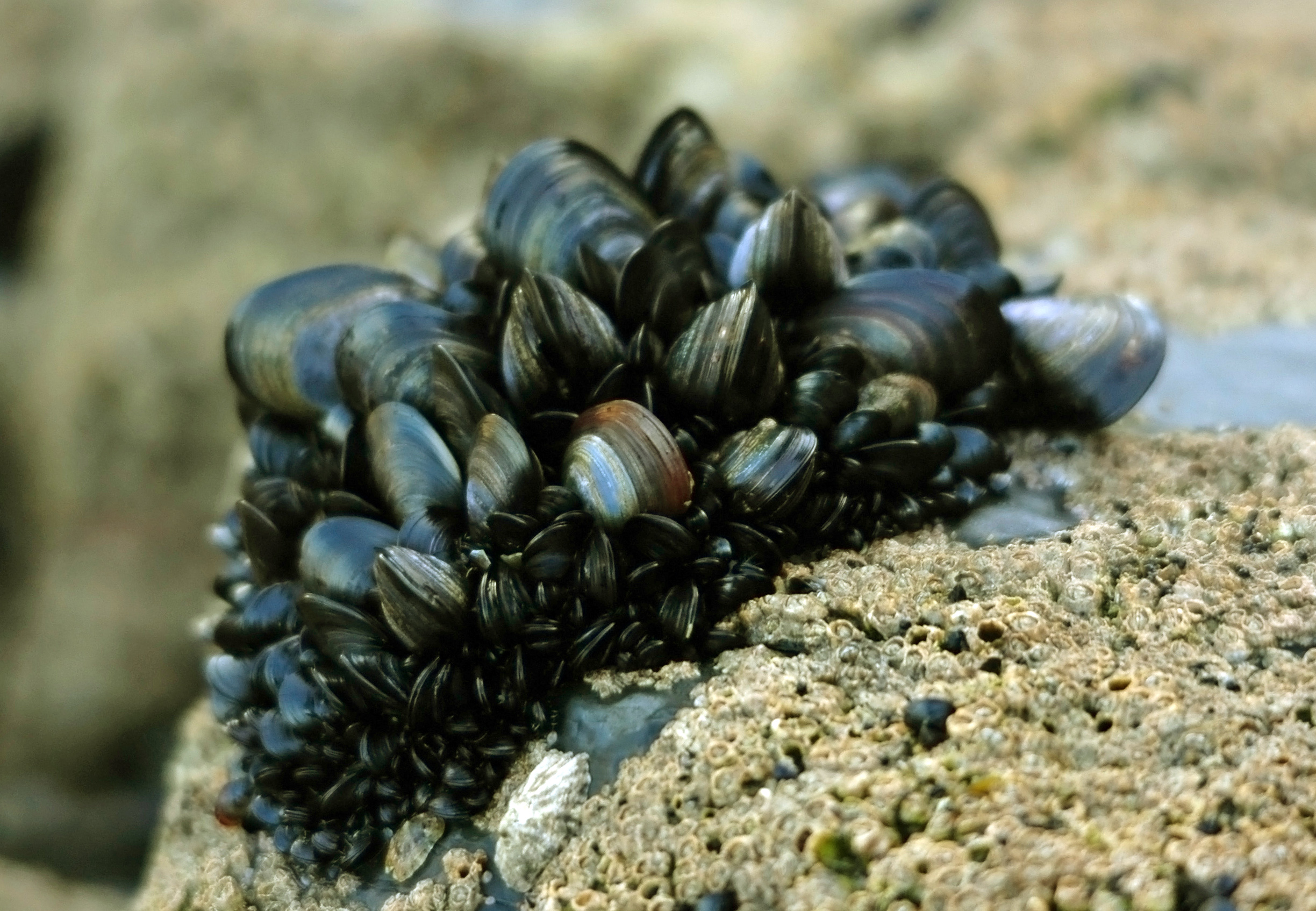
Mytilus edulis

Hybrid zones are thought to be less common in marine than terrestrial environments. However, blue mussel populations show extensive hybridisation worldwide and are a well studied example of a marine hybrid zone. There are multiple sites of hybridisation between the closely related species Mytilus edulis, Mytilus trossulus and Mytilus galloprovincialis across the North Atlantic and Pacific coasts. These hybrid zones vary considerably. Some hybrid zones, such as the one in Newfoundland in Canada show remarkably few hybrids, while in the Baltic Sea most individuals are hybrids.

Based on the fossil record and genetic marker studies the following chronology is used to explain the Canadian mussel hybrid zone:

- The genus Mytilus is at one point restricted to the North Pacific but spreads to the Atlantic through the Bering Strait around 3.5 million years ago.
- M. trossulus evolves in the North Pacific and M. edulis in the Atlantic in near allopatry as migration across the Bering Strait is very low.
- Recently, in post-glacial times, M. trossulus from the Pacific enters the Atlantic and colonises shores on both sides, and meets with the local M. edulis.

The Canadian mussel hybrid zone is unusual because both species are found along the entire shore (a mosaic pattern) instead of the typical cline found in most hybrid zones. Studies of mtDNA and allozymes in adult populations show that the distribution of genotypes between the two species is bimodal; pure parental types are most common (representing above 75% of individuals) while backcrosses close to parental forms are the next most prevalent. F1 hybrid crosses represent less than 2.5% of individuals.

The low frequency of F1 hybrids coupled with some introgression allows us to infer that although fertile hybrids can be produced, significant reproductive barriers exist and the two species are sufficiently deviated that they are now able to avoid recombinational collapse despite habitat sharing. One reason that could account for keeping taxa separate through prezygotic isolation is that in this region M. edulis spawns over a narrow 2–3 week period in July, while M. trossulus spawned over a more extensive period between late spring to early autumn. No infertility or developmental retardation was found in the hybrid individuals, allowing them to introgress with pure species.

== See also ==
- Genetic pollution
- Hybrid swarm
- Hybrid speciation
- Species boundary
- Introgression
- Hybrizyme
- Syngameon
