= Interploidy hybridization =

Interploidy hybridization is a term to describe a hybridization (or manual cross) between two different individuals of different ploidy levels. Individuals resulting from this type of hybridization are called interploidy hybrids. This phenomenon is often observed in plants. Interploidy hybridizations in angiosperms often cause abnormal seed development, leading to reduced seed size or seed abortion. This reproductive bottle neck leads to a phenomenon called triploid block. In agriculture, development of new plant cultivars, utilizing interploidy hybrids, is usually preceded by interspecific cross between two closely related species with different ploidy levels.
