= Syngameon =

Syngameon refers to groups of taxa that frequently engage in natural hybridization and lack strong reproductive barriers that prevent interbreeding. Syngameons are more common in plants than animals, with approximately 25% of plant species and 10% of animal species producing natural hybrids. The most well known syngameons include irises of the California Pacific Coast and white oaks of the Eastern United States. Hybridization within a syngameon is typically not equally distributed among species and few species often dominate patterns of hybridization.

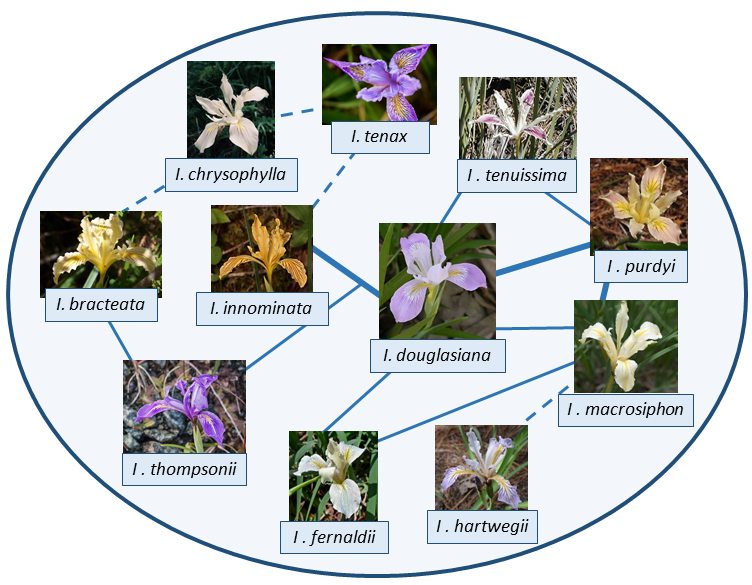
Pattern of hybridization in the Pacific iris syngameon. Solid lines indicate natural hybridization is common. Dashed lines indicate that natural hybridization is rare. Iris thompsonii is a hybrid species.

The term syngameon comes from the root word syngamy coined by Edward Bagnall Poulton to define groups that freely interbreed. He also coined the word asyngamy referring to groups that do not freely interbreed (with the substantive noun forms Syngamy and Asyngamy). The term syngameon was first used by Johannes Paulus Lotsy, who used it to describe a habitually interbreeding community that was reproductively isolated from other habitually interbreeding communities. Syngameon was used interchangeably with the term species to describe groups of closely related individuals that interbreed to varying degrees. A more specific definition of syngameon has been given to groups of taxa that frequently engage in natural hybridization and lack strong morphological differences that could be used to define them. Taxa in syngameons may have separate species names, but evolutionary biologists often suggest they should be treated as a single species. Variation among species within a syngameon can be due to a number of factors related to their biogeography, ecology, phylogeny, reproductive biology, and genetics.

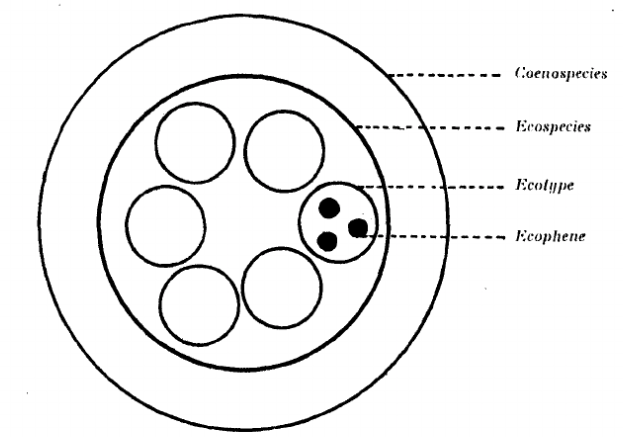
Relationship of coenospecies to ecospecies, ecotype, and ecophene

== Coenospecies ==
The terms coenospecies and syngameons are both used to describe clusters of lineages that are morphologically distinct and lack strong isolation mechanisms. Coenospecies, first coined by Göte Turesson in 1922, refers to the total sum of possible combinations in a genotype compound, which includes hybridization that occurs both naturally and artificially. Coenospecies is often used to describe lineages that can be crossed under cultivation and only a few species pairs are found to form natural hybrids, whereas syngameons refer to species where extensive evidence of natural hybridization occurs. In this sense, definitions of syngameon and coenospecies correspond to the two different definitions of the Biological Species Concept proposed by Ernst Mayr; syngameon is consistent with “actually” interbreeding species, while coenospecies is consistent with “actually or potentially” interbreeding species. The term ecospecies is considered a subdivision of coenospecies that refers to the genotypes within a coenospecies that hybridize and produce viable, fertile offspring.
