= Triploid block =

Formation of nonviable progeny after hybridization of flowering plants

Triploid block is a phenomenon describing the formation of nonviable progeny after hybridization of flowering plants that differ in ploidy. The barrier is established in the endosperm, a nutritive tissue in the seed supporting embryo growth. Triploid block typically happens when autopolyploidy occurs in diploid plants as a form of post-zygotic incompatibility and is hypothesized to be one of the primary forms of reproductive isolation driving speciation of polyploids.

Triploid block arises due to an imbalance of imprinted genes in the endosperm. The endosperm is a product of double fertilization and typically contains maternal and paternal genomic information at a ratio of 2:1. Mating between plants of differing ploidy can disrupt this balance, resulting in improper endosperm development and seed abortion. Direction of the cross can be important with regards to imprinted gene dosage as it has been shown that maternal excess in the endosperm is more tolerated than paternal excess, which is highly deleterious.

Triploid bridge refers to the ability of plants to overcome triploid block and is a step to forming a stable tetraploid. It is hypothesized that viable triploids enable gene flow between diploids and tetraploids in mixed populations.

Triploid block can be overcome in natural or synthetic ways. Chemical treatment with 5-Azacytidine has been shown to partially overcome triploid block. Polyspermy, additional fertilization of the egg cell, can also bypass triploid block to produce polyploids. Additionally, mutants in flavonoid biosynthesis components in the maternal seed coat tissue have been shown to partially rescue paternal excess triploid block, though the exact mechanism is unknown.
