= Hybrid swarm =

Population of hybrids beyond first hybrid generation

Model of hybrid swarm formation. Part A shows a pedigree that demonstrates how a hybrid swarm is formed. Two species combine initially with different genetic makeups and create new combinations of genes. The new species mate with the parent species, as well as with other hybrids. Through extensive hybridization and interbreeding a new population including hybrids, back crosses, and parent types forms, called a hybrid swarm. Part B shows the results of hybridization. The final population, or the hybrid swarm, consists of many individuals with varying genetic makeups. This is due to the extensive hybridization.

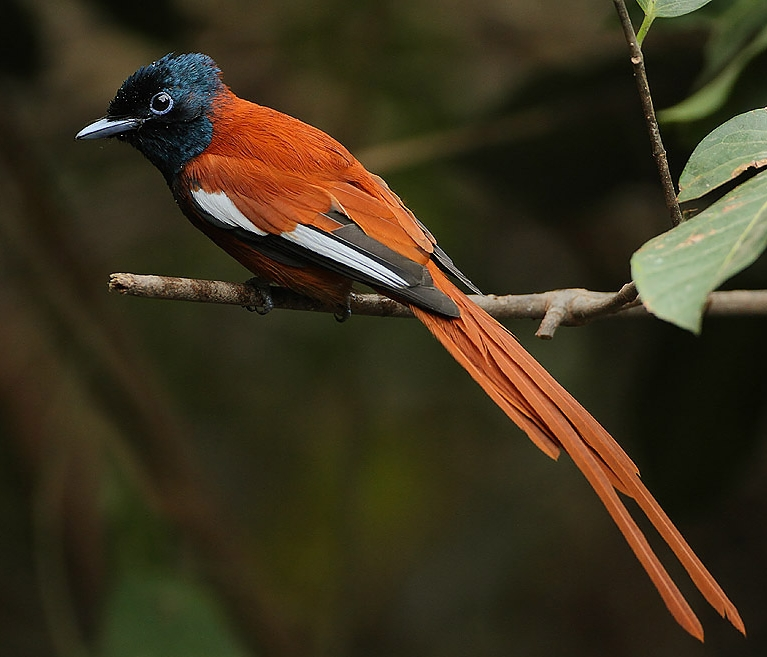
A red-bellied paradise flycatcher (Terpsiphone rufiventer) found in the gallery forests of Abuko, The Gambia (where many of the T. rufiventer are part of a hybrid swarm with T. viridis).

A hybrid swarm is a population of hybrids that has survived beyond the initial hybrid generation, with interbreeding between hybrid individuals and backcrossing with its parent types. Such population are highly variable, with the genetic and phenotypic characteristics of individuals ranging widely between the two parent types. Hybrid swarms thus blur the boundary between the parent taxa. Precise definitions of which populations can be classified as hybrid swarms vary, with some specifying simply that all members of a population should be hybrids, while others differ in whether all members should have the same or different levels of hybridization.

Hybrid swarms occur when the hybrid is viable and at least as vigorous as its parent types; and there are no barriers to crossbreeding between the hybrid and parent types. Swarms cannot occur if one of these conditions is not met: if the hybrid type has low viability, the hybrid population cannot maintain itself except by further hybridisation of the parent types, resulting in a hybrid population of low variability. On the other hand, if hybrids are vigorous but cannot backcross with parent populations, the result is hybrid speciation, which, aside from the contribution of new hybrids, evolves independently of its parent types. In either situation, it is possible for the hybrid population to overtake the parent populations. In some cases, this can even occur within the span of just a few generations. If the hybrid species has the greater viability, they can simply outcompete the parent species for resources, resulting in competitive exclusion, whereas if the parent species has the greater viability, gene flow between the two populations can result in decreased genetic variation.

Hybrid swarms form within hybrid zones, an area where two similar species come into contact and hybridize. These develop as a result of secondary contact between the parent species. After a long period of geographic isolation, the cause of which may be either natural or man-made, the reoccurrence of the parent species in the same environment can lead to interbreeding, hybridization, and potentially, a hybrid swarm. Hybrid swarms can lead to introgressive hybridization, or introgression, in which there is gene flow from the hybrid gene pool to the parental gene pool, or vice versa, occurring due to backcrossing between the populations. When introgression has occurred, there will be a high level of diversity in alleles near the vicinity of the hybrid swarm.

== Examples ==
In plants, it is possible for a hybrid swarm to form between self-pollinating and outcrossing species. One such example is hybridization between the self-pollinating wood aven and the mostly outcrossing water aven in the UK. In one study of a young hybrid swarm of these two species, the population was found to be composed of the parent species, F1 generation offspring, and backcrosses with the water aven, but no backcrosses with the wood aven and no F2 generation, which would result from self-pollinating F1s.

Hybrid swarms can also form between domestic and wild species, with one study proposing that wild rice is a hybrid swarm that has genetically mixed with domesticated rice.

== Invasive species ==
Hybrid swarms can pose a significant threat to an ecosystem when they involve invasive species, as invasive hybrids are frequently able to easily outcompete native species. As with other hybrid swarms, the hybrid genotypes may be more or less fit than the parent genotypes. In the event of a particular hybrid genotype having the greatest fitness, not only the native parent species, but also the exotic parent species may be outcompeted. On the other hand, if there is not one dominant genotype but rather trade-offs between different hybrid genotypes, a high degree of variability will occur between the hybrids, native species, and exotic species.

One example of an invasive hybrid swarm occurs among shiners in the upper Coosa River. A hybrid swarm was formed between the blacktail shiner, a species native to the river, and the red shiner, an invasive species. The population has expanded its range over time, moving both downstream and upstream while the proportion of hybrid individuals in the system is increasing. In addition, the size of the hybrid swarm has experienced a great degree of flux, experiencing alternating growth and decline over time.

== See also ==
- Hybrid speciation
- Hybrid zone
- Introgression
