= Reproductive isolation =

Evolutionary mechanism for speciation

The mechanisms of reproductive isolation are a collection of evolutionary mechanisms, behaviors and physiological processes critical for speciation. They prevent members of different species from producing offspring, or ensure that any offspring are sterile. These barriers maintain the integrity of a species by reducing gene flow between related species.

The mechanisms of reproductive isolation have been classified in a number of ways. Zoologist Ernst Mayr classified the mechanisms of reproductive isolation in two broad categories: pre-zygotic for those that act before fertilization (or before mating in the case of animals) and post-zygotic for those that act after it. The mechanisms are genetically controlled and can appear in species whose geographic distributions overlap (sympatric speciation) or are separate (allopatric speciation).

== Pre-zygotic isolation ==
Pre-zygotic isolation mechanisms are the most economic in terms of the natural selection of a population, as resources are not wasted on the production of a descendant that is weak, non-viable or sterile. These mechanisms include physiological or systemic barriers to fertilization.

=== Temporal or habitat isolation ===
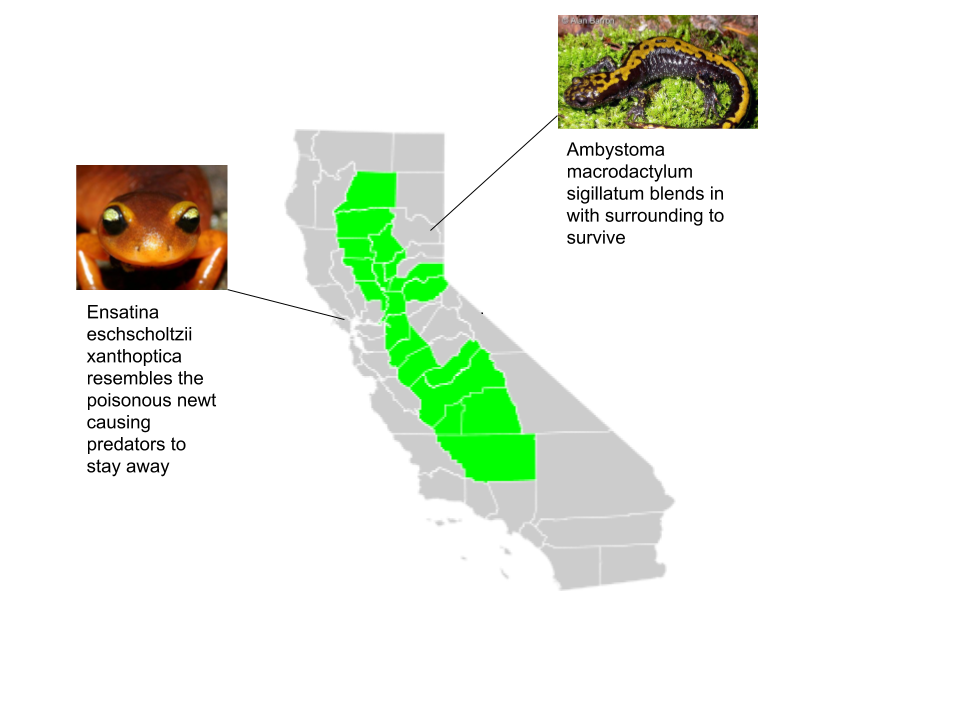
The Central Valley in California prevents the two salamander populations from interacting with each other which is an example of habitat isolation. After many generations the two salamander gene pools will become mutated caused by natural selection. The mutation will change the DNA sequence of the two populations enough that the salamander populations can no longer successfully breed between each other making the populations of salamander become classified as different species.

Any of the factors that prevent potentially fertile individuals from meeting will reproductively isolate the members of distinct species. The types of barriers that can cause this isolation include: different habitats, physical barriers, and a difference in the time of sexual maturity or flowering.

An example of the ecological or habitat differences that impede the meeting of potential pairs occurs in two fish species of the family Gasterosteidae (sticklebacks). One species lives all year round in fresh water, mainly in small streams. The other species lives in the sea during winter, but in spring and summer individuals migrate to river estuaries to reproduce. The members of the two populations are reproductively isolated due to their adaptations to distinct salt concentrations. An example of reproductive isolation due to differences in the mating season are found in the toad species Bufo americanus and Bufo fowleri. The members of these species can be successfully crossed in the laboratory producing healthy, fertile hybrids. However, mating does not occur in the wild even though the geographical distribution of the two species overlaps. The reason for the absence of inter-species mating is that B. americanus mates in early summer and B. fowleri in late summer. Certain plant species, such as Tradescantia canaliculata and T. subaspera, are sympatric throughout their geographic distribution, yet they are reproductively isolated as they flower at different times of the year. In addition, one species grows in sunny areas and the other in deeply shaded areas.

=== Behavioral isolation ===
The different mating rituals of animal species creates extremely powerful reproductive barriers, termed sexual or behavior isolation, that isolate apparently similar species in the majority of the groups of the animal kingdom. In dioecious species, males and females have to search for a partner, be in proximity to each other, carry out the complex mating rituals and finally copulate or release their gametes into the environment in order to breed.

The songs of birds, insects and many other animals are part of a ritual to attract potential partners of their own species. The song presents specific patterns recognizable only by members of the same species, and therefore represents a mechanism of reproductive isolation. This recording is the song of a species of cicada, recorded in New Zealand.

Mating dances, songs, or mutual grooming are all examples of typical courtship behavior that allows both recognition and reproductive isolation. The behaviors of both animals interlink, are synchronized in time and lead finally to copulation or the liberation of gametes into the environment. The smallest difference in the courting patterns of two species may be enough to prevent mating (for example, a specific song pattern acts as an isolation mechanism in distinct species of grasshopper of the genus Chorthippus). Even where there are minimal morphological differences between species, differences in behavior can be enough to prevent mating. For example, Drosophila melanogaster and D. simulans which are considered twin species due to their morphological similarity, do not mate even if they are kept together in a laboratory. Drosophila ananassae and D. pallidosa are twin species from Melanesia. In the wild they rarely produce hybrids, although in the laboratory it is possible to produce fertile offspring. Studies of their sexual behavior show that the males court the females of both species but the females show a marked preference for mating with males of their own species. A different regulator region has been found on Chromosome II of both species that affects the selection behavior of the females.

Pheromones play an important role in the sexual isolation of insect species. These compounds serve to identify individuals of the same species and of the same or different sex. Evaporated molecules of volatile pheromones can serve as a wide-reaching chemical signal. In other cases, pheromones may be detected only at a short distance or by contact.

In species of the melanogaster group of Drosophila, the pheromones of the females are mixtures of different compounds, there is a clear dimorphism in the type and/or quantity of compounds present for each sex. In addition, there are differences in the quantity and quality of constituent compounds between related species, it is assumed that the pheromones serve to distinguish between individuals of each species. An example of the role of pheromones in sexual isolation is found in 'corn borers' in the genus Ostrinia. There are two twin species in Europe that occasionally cross. The females of both species produce pheromones that contain a volatile compound which has two isomers, E and Z; 99% of the compound produced by the females of one species is in the E isomer form, while the females of the other produce 99% isomer Z. The production of the compound is controlled by just one locus and the interspecific hybrid produces an equal mix of the two isomers. The males, for their part, almost exclusively detect the isomer emitted by the females of their species, such that the hybridization although possible is scarce. The perception of the males is controlled by one gene, distinct from the one for the production of isomers, the heterozygous males show a moderate response to the odour of either type. In this case, just 2 'loci' produce the effect of ethological isolation between species that are genetically very similar.

Sexual isolation between two species can be asymmetrical. This can happen when the mating that produces descendants only allows one of the two species to function as the female progenitor and the other as the male, while the reciprocal cross does not occur. For instance, half of the wolves tested in the Great Lakes area of America show mitochondrial DNA sequences of coyotes, while mitochondrial DNA from wolves is never found in coyote populations. This probably reflects an asymmetry in inter-species mating due to the difference in size of the two species as male wolves take advantage of their greater size in order to mate with female coyotes, while female wolves and male coyotes do not mate.^{[a]}

=== Mechanical isolation ===
The flowers of many species of Angiosperm have evolved to attract and reward a single or a few pollinator species (insects, birds, mammals). Their wide diversity of form, colour, fragrance and presence of nectar is, in many cases, the result of coevolution with the pollinator species. This dependency on its pollinator species also acts as a reproductive isolation barrier.

Mating pairs may not be able to couple successfully if their genitals are not compatible. The relationship between the reproductive isolation of species and the form of their genital organs was signaled for the first time in 1844 by the French entomologist Léon Dufour. Insects' rigid carapaces act in a manner analogous to a lock and key, as they will only allow mating between individuals with complementary structures, that is, males and females of the same species (termed co-specifics).

Evolution has led to the development of genital organs with increasingly complex and divergent characteristics, which will cause mechanical isolation between species. Certain characteristics of the genital organs will often have converted them into mechanisms of isolation. However, numerous studies show that organs that are anatomically very different can be functionally compatible, indicating that other factors also determine the form of these complicated structures.

Mechanical isolation also occurs in plants and this is related to the adaptation and coevolution of each species in the attraction of a certain type of pollinator (where pollination is zoophilic) through a collection of morphophysiological characteristics of the flowers (called pollination syndrome), in such a way that the transport of pollen to other species does not occur.

=== Gametic isolation ===
The synchronous spawning of many species of coral in marine reefs means that inter-species hybridization can take place as the gametes of hundreds of individuals of tens of species are liberated into the same water at the same time. Approximately a third of all the possible crosses between species are compatible, in the sense that the gametes will fuse and lead to individual hybrids. This hybridization apparently plays a fundamental role in the evolution of coral species. However, the other two-thirds of possible crosses are incompatible. It has been observed that in sea urchins of the genus Strongylocentrotus the concentration of spermatocytes that allow 100% fertilization of the ovules of the same species is only able to fertilize 1.5% of the ovules of other species. This inability to produce hybrid offspring, despite the fact that the gametes are found at the same time and in the same place, is due to a phenomenon known as gamete incompatibility, which is often found between marine invertebrates, and whose physiological causes are not fully understood.

In some Drosophila crosses, the swelling of the female's vagina has been noted following insemination. This has the effect of consequently preventing the fertilization of the ovule by sperm of a different species.

In plants the pollen grains of a species can germinate in the stigma and grow in the style of other species. However, the growth of the pollen tubes may be detained at some point between the stigma and the ovules, in such a way that fertilization does not take place. This mechanism of reproductive isolation is common in the angiosperms and is called cross-incompatibility or incongruence. A relationship exists between self-incompatibility and the phenomenon of cross-incompatibility. In general crosses between individuals of a self-compatible species (SC) with individuals of a self-incompatible (SI) species give hybrid offspring. On the other hand, a reciprocal cross (SI x SC) will not produce offspring, because the pollen tubes will not reach the ovules. This is known as unilateral incompatibility, which also occurs when two SC or two SI species are crossed.

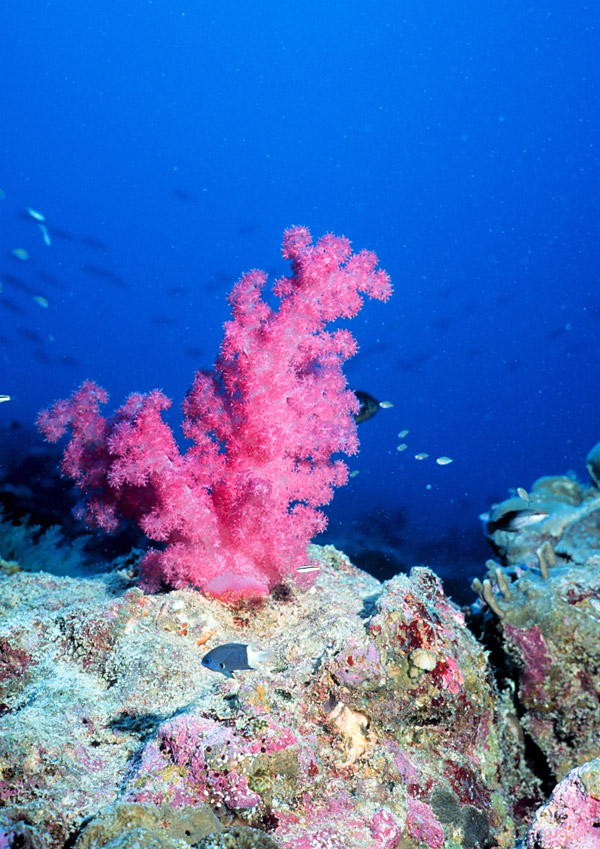
In coral reefs, gamete incompatibility prevents the formation of numerous inter-species hybrids.

== Post-zygotic isolation ==
A number of mechanisms which act after fertilization preventing successful inter-population crossing are discussed below.

=== Zygote mortality and non-viability of hybrids ===
A type of incompatibility that is found as often in plants as in animals occurs when the egg or ovule is fertilized but the zygote does not develop, or it develops and the resulting individual has a reduced viability. This is the case for crosses between species of the frog order, where widely differing results are observed depending upon the species involved. In some crosses there is no segmentation of the zygote (or it may be that the hybrid is extremely non-viable and changes occur from the first mitosis). In others, normal segmentation occurs in the blastula but gastrulation fails. Finally, in other crosses, the initial stages are normal but errors occur in the final phases of embryo development. This indicates differentiation of the embryo development genes (or gene complexes) in these species and these differences determine the non-viability of the hybrids.

Similar results are observed in mosquitoes of the genus Culex, but the differences are seen between reciprocal crosses, from which it is concluded that the same effect occurs in the interaction between the genes of the cell nucleus (inherited from both parents) as occurs in the genes of the cytoplasmic organelles which are inherited solely from the female progenitor through the cytoplasm of the ovule.

In Angiosperms, the successful development of the embryo depends on the normal functioning of its endosperm.

The failure of endosperm development and its subsequent abortion has been observed in many interploidal crosses (that is, those between populations with a particular degree of intra or interspecific ploidy), and in certain crosses in species with the same level of ploidy. The collapse of the endosperm, and the subsequent abortion of the hybrid embryo is one of the most common post-fertilization reproductive isolation mechanism found in angiosperms.

=== Hybrid sterility ===
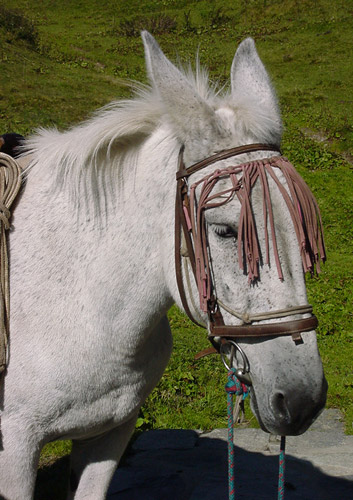
Mules are hybrids with interspecific sterility.

A hybrid may have normal viability but is typically deficient in terms of reproduction or is sterile. This is demonstrated by the mule and in many other well known hybrids. In all of these cases sterility is due to the interaction between the genes of the two species involved; to chromosomal imbalances due to the different number of chromosomes in the parent species; or to nucleus-cytoplasmic interactions such as in the case of Culex described above.

Hinnies and mules are hybrids resulting from a cross between a horse and a donkey or between a mare and a donkey, respectively. These animals are nearly always sterile due to the difference in the number of chromosomes between the two parent species. Both horses and donkeys belong to the genus Equus, but Equus caballus has 64 chromosomes, while Equus asinus only has 62. A cross will produce offspring (mule or hinny) with 63 chromosomes, that will not form pairs, which means that they do not divide in a balanced manner during meiosis. In the wild, the horses and donkeys ignore each other and do not cross. In order to obtain mules or hinnies it is necessary to train the progenitors to accept copulation between the species or create them through artificial insemination.

The sterility of many interspecific hybrids in angiosperms has been widely recognised and studied. Interspecific sterility of hybrids in plants has multiple possible causes. These may be genetic, related to the genomes, or the interaction between nuclear and cytoplasmic factors, as will be discussed in the corresponding section. Nevertheless, in plants, hybridization is a stimulus for the creation of new species – the contrary to the situation in animals. Although the hybrid may be sterile, it can continue to multiply in the wild by asexual reproduction, whether vegetative propagation or apomixis or the production of seeds. Indeed, interspecific hybridization can be associated with polyploidia and, in this way, the origin of new species that are called allopolyploids. Rosa canina, for example, is the result of multiple hybridizations. The common wheat (Triticum aestivum) is an allohexaploid (allopolyploid with six chromosome sets) that contains the genomes of three different species.

== Multiple mechanisms ==
In general, the barriers that separate species do not consist of just one mechanism. The twin species of Drosophila, D. pseudoobscura and D. persimilis, are isolated from each other by habitat (persimilis generally lives in colder regions at higher altitudes), by the timing of the mating season (persimilis is generally more active in the morning and pseudoobscura at night) and by behavior during mating (the females of both species prefer the males of their respective species). In this way, although the distribution of these species overlaps in wide areas of the west of the United States of America, these isolation mechanisms are sufficient to keep the species separated. Such that, only a few fertile females have been found amongst the other species among the thousands that have been analyzed. However, when hybrids are produced between both species, the gene flow between the two will continue to be impeded as the hybrid males are sterile. Also, and in contrast with the great vigor shown by the sterile males, the descendants of the backcrosses of the hybrid females with the parent species are weak and notoriously non-viable. This last mechanism restricts even more the genetic interchange between the two species of fly in the wild.

== Hybrid sex: Haldane's rule ==
Haldane's rule states that when one of the two sexes is absent in interspecific hybrids between two specific species, then the sex that is not produced, is rare or is sterile is the heterozygous (or heterogametic) sex. In mammals, at least, there is growing evidence to suggest that this is due to high rates of mutation of the genes determining masculinity in the Y chromosome.

It has been suggested that Haldane's rule simply reflects the fact that the male sex is more sensitive than the female when the sex-determining genes are included in a hybrid genome. But there are also organisms in which the heterozygous sex is the female: birds and butterflies and the law is followed in these organisms. Therefore, it is not a problem related to sexual development, nor with the sex chromosomes. Haldane proposed that the stability of hybrid individual development requires the full gene complement of each parent species, so that the hybrid of the heterozygous sex is unbalanced (i.e. missing at least one chromosome from each of the parental species). For example, the hybrid male obtained by crossing D. melanogaster females with D. simulans males, which is non-viable, lacks the X chromosome of D. simulans.

== Genetics ==
=== Pre-copulatory mechanisms in animals ===
The genetics of ethological isolation barriers will be discussed first. Pre-copulatory isolation occurs when the genes necessary for the sexual reproduction of one species differ from the equivalent genes of another species, such that if a male of species A and a female of species B are placed together they are unable to copulate. Study of the genetics involved in this reproductive barrier tries to identify the genes that govern distinct sexual behaviors in the two species. The males of Drosophila melanogaster and those of D. simulans conduct an elaborate courtship with their respective females, which are different for each species, but the differences between the species are more quantitative than qualitative. In fact the simulans males are able to hybridize with the melanogaster females. Although there are lines of the latter species that can easily cross there are others that are hardly able to. Using this difference, it is possible to assess the minimum number of genes involved in pre-copulatory isolation between the melanogaster and simulans species and their chromosomal location.

In experiments, flies of the D. melanogaster line, which hybridizes readily with simulans, were crossed with another line that it does not hybridize with, or rarely. The females of the segregated populations obtained by this cross were placed next to simulans males and the percentage of hybridization was recorded, which is a measure of the degree of reproductive isolation. It was concluded from this experiment that 3 of the 8 chromosomes of the haploid complement of D. melanogaster carry at least one gene that affects isolation, such that substituting one chromosome from a line of low isolation with another of high isolation reduces the hybridization frequency. In addition, interactions between chromosomes are detected so that certain combinations of the chromosomes have a multiplying effect. Cross incompatibility or incongruence in plants is also determined by major genes that are not associated at the self-incompatibility S locus.

=== Post-copulation or fertilization mechanisms in animals ===
Reproductive isolation between species appears, in certain cases, a long time after fertilization and the formation of the zygote, as happens – for example – in the twin species Drosophila pavani and D. gaucha. The hybrids between both species are not sterile, in the sense that they produce viable gametes, ovules and spermatozoa. However, they cannot produce offspring as the sperm of the hybrid male do not survive in the semen receptors of the females, be they hybrids or from the parent lines. In the same way, the sperm of the males of the two parent species do not survive in the reproductive tract of the hybrid female. This type of post-copulatory isolation appears as the most efficient system for maintaining reproductive isolation in many species.

The development of a zygote into an adult is a complex and delicate process of interactions between genes and the environment that must be carried out precisely, and if there is any alteration in the usual process, caused by the absence of a necessary gene or the presence of a different one, it can arrest the normal development causing the non-viability of the hybrid or its sterility. It should be borne in mind that half of the chromosomes and genes of a hybrid are from one species and the other half come from the other. If the two species are genetically different, there is little possibility that the genes from both will act harmoniously in the hybrid. From this perspective, only a few genes would be required in order to bring about post copulatory isolation, as opposed to the situation described previously for pre-copulatory isolation.

In many species where pre-copulatory reproductive isolation does not exist, hybrids are produced but they are of only one sex. This is the case for the hybridization between females of Drosophila simulans and Drosophila melanogaster males: the hybridized females die early in their development so that only males are seen among the offspring. However, populations of D. simulans have been recorded with genes that permit the development of adult hybrid females, that is, the viability of the females is "rescued". It is assumed that the normal activity of these speciation genes is to "inhibit" the expression of the genes that allow the growth of the hybrid. There will also be regulator genes.

A number of these genes have been found in the melanogaster species group. The first to be discovered was "Lhr" (Lethal hybrid rescue) located in Chromosome II of D. simulans. This dominant allele allows the development of hybrid females from the cross between simulans females and melanogaster males. A different gene, also located on Chromosome II of D. simulans is "Shfr" that also allows the development of female hybrids, its activity being dependent on the temperature at which development occurs. Other similar genes have been located in distinct populations of species of this group. In short, only a few genes are needed for an effective post copulatory isolation barrier mediated through the non-viability of the hybrids.

As important as identifying an isolation gene is knowing its function. The Hmr gene, linked to the X chromosome and implicated in the viability of male hybrids between D. melanogaster and D. simulans, is a gene from the proto-oncogene family myb, that codes for a transcriptional regulator. Two variants of this gene function perfectly well in each separate species, but in the hybrid they do not function correctly, possibly due to the different genetic background of each species. Examination of the allele sequence of the two species shows that change of direction substitutions are more abundant than synonymous substitutions, suggesting that this gene has been subject to intense natural selection.

The Dobzhansky–Muller model proposes that reproductive incompatibilities between species are caused by the interaction of the genes of the respective species. It has been demonstrated recently that Lhr has functionally diverged in D. simulans and will interact with Hmr which, in turn, has functionally diverged in D. melanogaster to cause the lethality of the male hybrids. Lhr is located in a heterochromatic region of the genome and its sequence has diverged between these two species in a manner consistent with the mechanisms of positive selection. An important unanswered question is whether the genes detected correspond to old genes that initiated the speciation favoring hybrid non-viability, or are modern genes that have appeared post-speciation by mutation, that are not shared by the different populations and that suppress the effect of the primitive non-viability genes. The OdsH (abbreviation of Odysseus) gene causes partial sterility in the hybrid between Drosophila simulans and a related species, D. mauritiana, which is only encountered on Mauritius, and is of recent origin. This gene shows monophyly in both species and also has been subject to natural selection. It is thought that it is a gene that intervenes in the initial stages of speciation, while other genes that differentiate the two species show polyphyly. Odsh originated by duplication in the genome of Drosophila and has evolved at very high rates in D. mauritania, while its paralogue, unc-4, is nearly identical between the species of the group melanogaster. Seemingly, all these cases illustrate the manner in which speciation mechanisms originated in nature, therefore they are collectively known as "speciation genes", or possibly, gene sequences with a normal function within the populations of a species that diverge rapidly in response to positive selection thereby forming reproductive isolation barriers with other species. In general, all these genes have functions in the transcriptional regulation of other genes.

The Nup96 gene is another example of the evolution of the genes implicated in post-copulatory isolation. It regulates the production of one of the approximately 30 proteins required to form a nuclear pore. In each of the simulans groups of Drosophila the protein from this gene interacts with the protein from another, as yet undiscovered, gene on the X chromosome in order to form a functioning pore. However, in a hybrid the pore that is formed is defective and causes sterility. The differences in the sequences of Nup96 have been subject to adaptive selection, similar to the other examples of speciation genes described above.

Post-copulatory isolation can also arise between chromosomally differentiated populations due to chromosomal translocations and inversions. If, for example, a reciprocal translocation is fixed in a population, the hybrid produced between this population and one that does not carry the translocation will not have a complete meiosis. This will result in the production of unequal gametes containing unequal numbers of chromosomes with a reduced fertility. In certain cases, complete translocations exist that involve more than two chromosomes, so that the meiosis of the hybrids is irregular and their fertility is zero or nearly zero. Inversions can also give rise to abnormal gametes in heterozygous individuals but this effect has little importance compared to translocations. An example of chromosomal changes causing sterility in hybrids comes from the study of Drosophila nasuta and D. albomicans which are twin species from the Indo-Pacific region. There is no sexual isolation between them and the F1 hybrid is fertile. However, the F2 hybrids are relatively infertile and leave few descendants which have a skewed ratio of the sexes. The reason is that the X chromosome of albomicans is translocated and linked to an autosome which causes abnormal meiosis in hybrids. Robertsonian translocations are variations in the numbers of chromosomes that arise from either: the fusion of two acrocentric chromosomes into a single chromosome with two arms, causing a reduction in the haploid number, or conversely; or the fission of one chromosome into two acrocentric chromosomes, in this case increasing the haploid number. The hybrids of two populations with differing numbers of chromosomes can experience a certain loss of fertility, and therefore a poor adaptation, because of irregular meiosis.

=== In plants ===
A large variety of mechanisms have been demonstrated to reinforce reproductive isolation between closely related plant species that either historically lived or currently live in sympatry. This phenomenon is driven by strong selection against hybrids, typically resulting from instances in which hybrids suffer reduced fitness. Such negative fitness consequences have been proposed to be the result of negative epistasis in hybrid genomes and can also result from the effects of hybrid sterility. In such cases, selection gives rise to population-specific isolating mechanisms to prevent either fertilization by interspecific gametes or the development of hybrid embryos.

Because many sexually reproducing species of plants are exposed to a variety of interspecific gametes, natural selection has given rise to a variety of mechanisms to prevent the production of hybrids. These mechanisms can act at different stages in the developmental process and are typically divided into two categories, pre-fertilization and post-fertilization, indicating at which point the barrier acts to prevent either zygote formation or development. In the case of angiosperms and other pollinated species, pre-fertilization mechanisms can be further subdivided into two more categories, pre-pollination and post-pollination, the difference between the two being whether or not a pollen tube is formed. (Typically when pollen encounters a receptive stigma, a series of changes occur which ultimately lead to the growth of a pollen tube down the style, allowing for the formation of the zygote.) Empirical investigation has demonstrated that these barriers act at many different developmental stages and species can have none, one, or many barriers to hybridization with interspecifics.

=== Examples of pre-fertilization mechanisms ===
A well-documented example of a pre-fertilization isolating mechanism comes from study of Louisiana iris species. These iris species were fertilized with interspecific and conspecific pollen loads and it was demonstrated by measure of hybrid progeny success that differences in pollen-tube growth between interspecific and conspecific pollen led to a lower fertilization rate by interspecific pollen. This demonstrates how a specific point in the reproductive process is manipulated by a particular isolating mechanism to prevent hybrids.

Another well-documented example of a pre-fertilization isolating mechanism in plants comes from study of the 2 wind-pollinated birch species. Study of these species led to the discovery that mixed conspecific and interspecific pollen loads still result in 98% conspecific fertilization rates, highlighting the effectiveness of such barriers. In this example, pollen tube incompatibility and slower generative mitosis have been implicated in the post-pollination isolation mechanism.

=== Examples of post-fertilization mechanisms ===
Crosses between diploid and tetraploid species of Paspalum provide evidence of a post-fertilization mechanism preventing hybrid formation when pollen from tetraploid species was used to fertilize a female of a diploid species. There were signs of fertilization and even endosperm formation but subsequently this endosperm collapsed. This demonstrates evidence of an early post-fertilization isolating mechanism, in which the hybrid early embryo is detected and selectively aborted. This process can also occur later during development in which developed, hybrid seeds are selectively aborted.

=== Effects of hybrid necrosis ===
Plant hybrids often suffer from an autoimmune syndrome known as hybrid necrosis. In the hybrids, specific gene products contributed by one of the parents may be inappropriately recognized as foreign and pathogenic, and thus trigger pervasive cell death throughout the plant. In at least one case, a pathogen receptor, encoded by the most variable gene family in plants, was identified as being responsible for hybrid necrosis.

=== Chromosomal rearrangements in yeast ===
In brewers' yeast Saccharomyces cerevisiae, chromosomal rearrangements are a major mechanism to reproductively isolate different strains. Hou et al. showed that reproductive isolation acts postzygotically and could be attributed to chromosomal rearrangements. These authors crossed 60 natural isolates sampled from diverse niches with the reference strain S288c and identified 16 cases of reproductive isolation with reduced offspring viabilities, and identified reciprocal chromosomal translocations in a large fraction of isolates.

=== Incompatibility caused by microorganisms ===
In addition to the genetic causes of reproductive isolation between species there is another factor that can cause post zygotic isolation: the presence of microorganisms in the cytoplasm of certain species. The presence of these organisms in a species and their absence in another causes the non-viability of the corresponding hybrid. For example, in the semi-species of the group D. paulistorum the hybrid females are fertile but the males are sterile, this is due to the presence of a Wolbachia in the cytoplasm which alters spermatogenesis leading to sterility. It is interesting that incompatibility or isolation can also arise at an intraspecific level. Populations of D. simulans have been studied that show hybrid sterility according to the direction of the cross. The factor determining sterility has been found to be the presence or absence of a microorganism Wolbachia and the populations tolerance or susceptibility to these organisms. This inter population incompatibility can be eliminated in the laboratory through the administration of a specific antibiotic to kill the microorganism. Similar situations are known in a number of insects, as around 15% of species show infections caused by this symbiont. It has been suggested that, in some cases, the speciation process has taken place because of the incompatibility caused by this bacteria. Two wasp species Nasonia giraulti and N. longicornis carry two different strains of Wolbachia. Crosses between an infected population and one free from infection produces a nearly total reproductive isolation between the semi-species. However, if both species are free from the bacteria or both are treated with antibiotics there is no reproductive barrier. Wolbachia also induces incompatibility due to the weakness of the hybrids in populations of spider mites (Tetranychus urticae), between Drosophila recens and D. subquinaria and between species of Diabrotica (beetle) and Gryllus (cricket).

== Selection ==
Selection for reproductive isolation between two Drosophila species.
Generation	Percentage of hybrids
1	49
2	17.6
3	3.3
4	1.0
5	1.4
10	0.6

In 1950 K. F. Koopman reported results from experiments designed to examine the hypothesis that selection can increase reproductive isolation between populations. He used D. pseudoobscura and D. persimilis in these experiments. When the flies of these species are kept at 16 °C approximately a third of the matings are interspecific. In the experiment equal numbers of males and females of both species were placed in containers suitable for their survival and reproduction. The progeny of each generation were examined in order to determine if there were any interspecific hybrids. These hybrids were then eliminated. An equal number of males and females of the resulting progeny were then chosen to act as progenitors of the next generation. As the hybrids were destroyed in each generation the flies that solely mated with members of their own species produced more surviving descendants than the flies that mated solely with individuals of the other species. In the adjacent table it can be seen that for each generation the number of hybrids continuously decreased up to the tenth generation when hardly any interspecific hybrids were produced. It is evident that selection against the hybrids was very effective in increasing reproductive isolation between these species. From the third generation, the proportions of the hybrids were less than 5%. This confirmed that selection acts to reinforce the reproductive isolation of two genetically divergent populations if the hybrids formed by these species are less well adapted than their parents.

These discoveries allowed certain assumptions to be made regarding the origin of reproductive isolation mechanisms in nature. Namely, if selection reinforces the degree of reproductive isolation that exists between two species due to the poor adaptive value of the hybrids, it is expected that the populations of two species located in the same area will show a greater reproductive isolation than populations that are geographically separated (see reinforcement). This mechanism for "reinforcing" hybridization barriers in sympatric populations is also known as the "Wallace effect", as it was first proposed by Alfred Russel Wallace at the end of the 19th century, and it has been experimentally demonstrated in both plants and animals.

The sexual isolation between Drosophila miranda and D. pseudoobscura, for example, is more or less pronounced according to the geographic origin of the flies being studied. Flies from regions where the distribution of the species is superimposed show a greater sexual isolation than exists between populations originating in distant regions.

Reproductive isolation can be caused by allopatric speciation. A population of Drosophila was divided into sub populations selected to adapt to different food types. After some generations the two sub populations were mixed again. Subsequent matings occurred between individuals belonging to the same adapted group.

On the other hand, interspecific hybridization barriers can also arise as a result of the adaptive divergence that accompanies allopatric speciation. This mechanism has been experimentally proved by an experiment carried out by Diane Dodd on D. pseudoobscura. A single population of flies was divided into two, with one of the populations fed with starch-based food and the other with maltose-based food. This meant that each sub population was adapted to each food type over a number of generations. After the populations had diverged over many generations, the groups were again mixed; it was observed that the flies would mate only with others from their adapted population. This indicates that the mechanisms of reproductive isolation can arise even though the interspecific hybrids are not selected against.

== See also ==
- Species problem
- History of evolutionary thought
- History of speciation

== Notes ==
a. The DNA of the mitochondria and chloroplasts is inherited from the maternal line, i.e. all the progeny derived from a particular cross possess the same cytoplasm (and genetic factors located in it) as the female progenitor. This is because the zygote possesses the same cytoplasm as the ovule, although its nucleus comes equally from the father and the mother.

== Sources ==
- Barton N.; Bengtsson B. O. (1986), "The barrier to genetic exchange between hybridising populations", Heredity, 57 (3): 357–376, Bibcode:1986Hered..57..357B, doi:10.1038/hdy.1986.135, PMID 3804765
- Barton N.; Hewitt G. M. (1985), "Analysis of hybrid zones", Annual Review of Ecology and Systematics, 16 (1): 113–148, Bibcode:1985AnRES..16..113B, doi:10.1146/annurev.es.16.110185.000553
- Baker H G (1959), "Reproductive methods as factors in speciation in flowering plants", Cold Spring Harb Symp Quant Biol, 24: 177–191, doi:10.1101/sqb.1959.024.01.019, PMID 13796002
- Grant V (1966), "The selective origin of incompatibility barriers in the plant genus Gilia", Am Nat, 100 (911): 99–118, Bibcode:1966ANat..100...99G, doi:10.1086/282404, S2CID 84918503
- Grant K, Grant V (1964), "Mechanical isolation of Salvia apiana and Salvia mellifera (Labiatae)", Evolution, 18 (2): 196–212, doi:10.2307/2406392, JSTOR 2406392
- Grun P, Radlow A (1961), "Evolution of barriers to crossing of self-incompatible and self-compatible species of Solanum", Heredity, 16 (2): 137–143, doi:10.1038/hdy.1961.16, S2CID 7972107
- Jain SK, Bradshaw AD (1966), "Evolutionary divergence among adjacent plant populations. I. The evidence and its theoretical analysis", Heredity, 21 (3): 407–441, Bibcode:1966Hered..21..407J, doi:10.1038/hdy.1966.42
- Mayr, E (1963), Animal species and evolution, Harvard University Press
- McNeilly T (1967), "Evolution in closely adjacent plant populations. III. Agrostis tenuis on a small copper mine", Heredity, 23 (1): 99–108, doi:10.1038/hdy.1968.8
- Stebbins G L (1958), The Inviability, Weakness, and Sterility of Interspecific Hybrids, Advances in Genetics, vol. 9, pp. 147–215, doi:10.1016/S0065-2660(08)60162-5, ISBN 978-0-12-017609-0, PMID 13520442
- Strickberger, M (1978), Genética (in Spanish), Omega, Barcelona, pp. 874–879, ISBN 978-84-282-0369-2
