= Monad to Man =

1996 book by Michael Ruse

Monad to Man: the concept of progress in evolutionary biology
- Cover of the first edition
- Author: Michael Ruse
- Language: English
- Subject: Progressionism
- Publisher: Harvard University Press
- Publication date: 1996
- Publication place: United States
- Media type: Print
- Pages: 648
- ISBN: 978-0674582200

Monad to Man: the concept of progress in evolutionary biology is a 1996 book about the longstanding idea that evolution is progressive by the philosopher of biology Michael Ruse. It analyses the connection between ideas of progress in culture generally and its application in evolutionary biology.

== Summary ==
Ruse surveys the attitude to progress throughout the history of biology, exploring the connections between the idea of progress and the belief that evolution is progressive (orthogenesis). He argues that from early nineteenth century speculation, Charles Darwin came to suggest that natural selection drove species to "a higher stage of perfection", jumping from relative to absolute progress. In this, Ruse argues, he was followed by many later biologists. Ruse interviews well-known evolutionary biologists such as Ernst Mayr, John Maynard Smith, Stephen Jay Gould, and E. O. Wilson, and both reports their views and gives his own opinion of how progressionist they were.

== Illustrations ==
The book is illustrated with photographs of the major figures, such as Henry Fairfield Osborn and Sewall Wright, and a few drawings such as of the titanothere, an animal used by Osborn to illustrate "orthogenetic evolution beyond the adaptive optimum" There are a few diagrams such as William Bateson's schematic "phylogeny", a proposed tree of life for some invertebrate animals.

== Publication history ==
Monad to Man was first published by Harvard University Press with cloth covers in 1996. They produced the first paperback edition in 2009.

== Reception ==
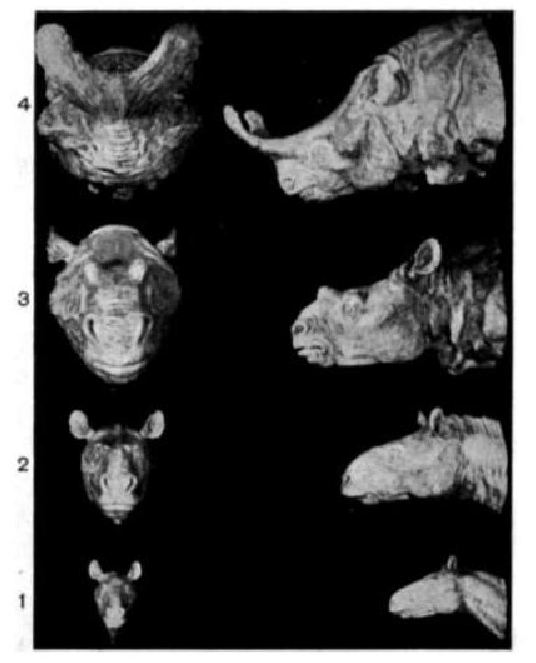
Ruse discusses Henry Fairfield Osborn's 1934 version of orthogenesis. Osborn supposed that the horns of Titanotheres evolved progressively into a baroque form, way beyond the adaptive optimum.

Makarand Paranjape, in an "introductory essay" for The International Society for Science and Religion, notes that Ruse was a "key witness" in the 1982 court case which decided that the attempt by Arkansas to ban the teaching of evolution in schools was unconstitutional. Paranjape writes that Ruse argues that evolutionary biology has been an immature science "for much of its 150 year history", because it has been tied to the Enlightenment's idea of progress. He suggests that Ruse is "unapologetically, even unreflexively Euro-centric", leaving out non-Western thinkers like Sri Aurobindo, and notes that Ruse ends by predicting that "Progress will continue to dog evolutionary theory" because as Ruse explains, the belief of evolutionists in scientific Progress [with a capital P] is so readily transferred into "a belief in organic progress".

The philosopher of science Ron Amundson, reviewing the book for The British Journal for the Philosophy of Science, notes that Ruse thanks E. O. Wilson for urging him "to write a really big book", and quotes Peter J. Bowler as calling it "an important book on the status of evolutionism that will almost certainly become embroiled in controversy". Amundson observes that Ruse claims that evolutionary biology has nearly always been seen as only doubtfully a professional scientific discipline, and that Ruse's thesis is that this is because it has always been tied to "culturally biased concepts of progress". Whether this is actually "bad" is, suggests Amundson, almost irrelevant as long as biologists have thought it so, but since normative (value) judgements such as of progress cannot be derived from observation they are from a methodological point of view not part of science. All the same, he argues, Ruse is an analytic and empiricist philosopher, not at all social-constructivist. Amundson finds Ruse's handling of the morphological traditions "less satisfactory" than of the adaptationist, Darwinian traditions, and doubts whether Richard Owen was a social progressionist just because he was influenced by Naturphilosophie. He compares Ruse unfavourably with Betty Smocovitis's "obsessive concern with historiography", and calls Ruse's writing style "bluff, unselfconscious, and opinionated" and finds Ruse sarcastic, "scarcely a neutral observer". On the other hand, he notes, Ruse is completely open about when he is "sensing" (guessing) something. Amundson concludes that Ruse has certainly shown that evolution and progress "have been closely linked", and his narrative of the people and ideas "rich and compelling", but finds Ruse's claim that biology has been shaped by biologists's embarrassment at this connection debatable.

The biologist and philosopher Michael Ghiselin notes that biologists agree that there is progress in biology and in technology, and that anatomists "do not seem too unhappy with the idea" of something much like that sort of progress in evolution, but that biologists have had trouble finding a theory of progress that did not lead into problems with ideology and "bad metaphysics". He criticises Ruse for "politically correct" "academic bigotry", disagrees with Ruse's narrative about phylogenetics, and accuses him of "completely ignor[ing] recent work such as by Carl Woese, "neglect[ing] data" that contradict his thesis. Ironically, in Ghiselin's view, Ruse's own epistemological ideal for science relies on the idea of Progress.
