= The eclipse of Darwinism =

Period when evolution was widely accepted, but natural selection was not

Julian Huxley used the phrase "the eclipse of Darwinism" (Note: In (Huxley 1942, pp. 22–28). Used earlier, c. 1925, in an unpublished manuscript by David Starr Jordan, to imply that Darwinism was in relative decline, the interest of biologists being elsewhere.) to describe the state of affairs prior to what he called the "modern synthesis". During the "eclipse", evolution was widely accepted in scientific circles but relatively few biologists believed that natural selection was its primary mechanism. Historians of science such as Peter J. Bowler have used the same phrase as a label for the period within the history of evolutionary thought from the 1880s to around 1920, when alternatives to natural selection were developed and explored—as many biologists considered natural selection to have been a wrong guess on Charles Darwin's part, or at least to be of relatively minor importance.

Four major alternatives to natural selection were in play in the 19th century:

- Theistic evolution, the belief that God directly guided evolution (Note: This should not be confused with a more recent use of the term theistic evolution, which refers to a theological belief in the compatibility of science and religion.)
- Neo-Lamarckism, the idea that evolution was driven by the inheritance of characteristics acquired during the life of the organism
- Orthogenesis, the belief that organisms were affected by internal forces or laws of development that drove evolution in particular directions
- Mutationism, the idea that evolution was largely the product of mutations that created new forms or species in a single step.

Theistic evolution had largely disappeared from the scientific literature by the end of the 19th century as direct appeals to supernatural causes came to be seen as unscientific. The other alternatives had significant followings well into the 20th century; mainstream biology largely abandoned them only when developments in genetics made them seem increasingly untenable, and when the development of population genetics and the modern synthesis demonstrated the explanatory power of natural selection. Ernst Mayr wrote that as late as 1930 most textbooks still emphasized such non-Darwinian mechanisms.

== Context ==
Evolution was widely accepted in scientific circles within a few years after the publication of On the Origin of Species, but there was much less acceptance of natural selection as its driving mechanism. Six objections were raised to the theory in the 19th century:

Blending inheritance leads to the averaging out of every characteristic, which as the engineer Fleeming Jenkin pointed out, makes evolution by natural selection impossible.

1. The fossil record was discontinuous, suggesting gaps in evolution.
2. The physicist Lord Kelvin calculated in 1862 that the Earth would have cooled in 100 million years or less from its formation, too little time for evolution. (Note: Years later, the discovery of radioactivity provided for a continual source of heat within the earth, and an age in billions of years, supporting Darwin's position.)
3. It was argued that many structures were nonadaptive (functionless), so they could not have evolved under natural selection.
4. Some structures seemed to have evolved on a regular pattern, like the eyes of unrelated animals such as the squid and mammals.
5. Natural selection was argued not to be creative, while variation was admitted to be mostly not of value.
6. The engineer Fleeming Jenkin (Note: Jenkin was a polymath, and a friend of Kelvin's.) correctly noted in 1868, reviewing The Origin of Species, that the blending inheritance favoured by Charles Darwin would oppose the action of natural selection. (Note: Blending inheritance was discarded in favour of Mendelian genetics early in the 20th century.)

Both Darwin and his close supporter Thomas Henry Huxley (Note: Huxley was known as "Darwin's Bulldog".) freely admitted, too, that selection might not be the whole explanation; Darwin was prepared to accept a measure of Lamarckism, while Huxley was comfortable with both sudden (mutational) change and directed (orthogenetic) evolution.

By the end of the 19th century, criticism of natural selection had reached the point that in 1903 the German botanist, Eberhard Dennert, edited a series of articles intended to show that "Darwinism will soon be a thing of the past, a matter of history; that we even now stand at its death-bed, while its friends are solicitous only to secure for it a decent burial." In 1907, the Stanford University entomologist Vernon Lyman Kellogg, who supported natural selection, asserted that "... the fair truth is that the Darwinian selection theory, considered with regard to its claimed capacity to be an independently sufficient mechanical explanation of descent, stands today seriously discredited in the biological world." He added, however, that there were problems preventing the widespread acceptance of any of the alternatives, as large mutations seemed too uncommon, and there was no experimental evidence of mechanisms that could support either Lamarckism or orthogenesis. Ernst Mayr wrote that a survey of evolutionary literature and biology textbooks showed that as late as 1930 the belief that natural selection was the most important factor in evolution was a minority viewpoint, with only a few population geneticists being strict selectionists.

=== Motivation for alternatives ===
A variety of different factors motivated people to propose other evolutionary mechanisms as alternatives to natural selection, some of them dating back before Darwin's Origin of Species. Natural selection, with its emphasis on death and competition, did not appeal to some naturalists because they felt it was immoral, and left little room for teleology or the concept of progress in the development of life. Some of these scientists and philosophers, like St. George Jackson Mivart and Charles Lyell, who came to accept evolution but disliked natural selection, raised religious objections. Others, such as Herbert Spencer, the botanist George Henslow (son of Darwin's mentor John Stevens Henslow, also a botanist), and Samuel Butler, felt that evolution was an inherently progressive process that natural selection alone was insufficient to explain. Still others, including the American paleontologists Edward Drinker Cope and Alpheus Hyatt, had an idealist perspective and felt that nature, including the development of life, followed orderly patterns that natural selection could not explain.

Another factor was the rise of a new faction of biologists at the end of the 19th century, typified by the geneticists Hugo DeVries and Thomas Hunt Morgan, who wanted to recast biology as an experimental laboratory science. They distrusted the work of naturalists like Darwin and Alfred Russel Wallace, dependent on field observations of variation, adaptation, and biogeography, considering these overly anecdotal. Instead they focused on topics like physiology, and genetics that could be easily investigated with controlled experiments in the laboratory, and discounted natural selection and the degree to which organisms were adapted to their environment, which could not easily be tested experimentally.

== Anti-Darwinist theories during the eclipse ==
=== Theistic evolution ===
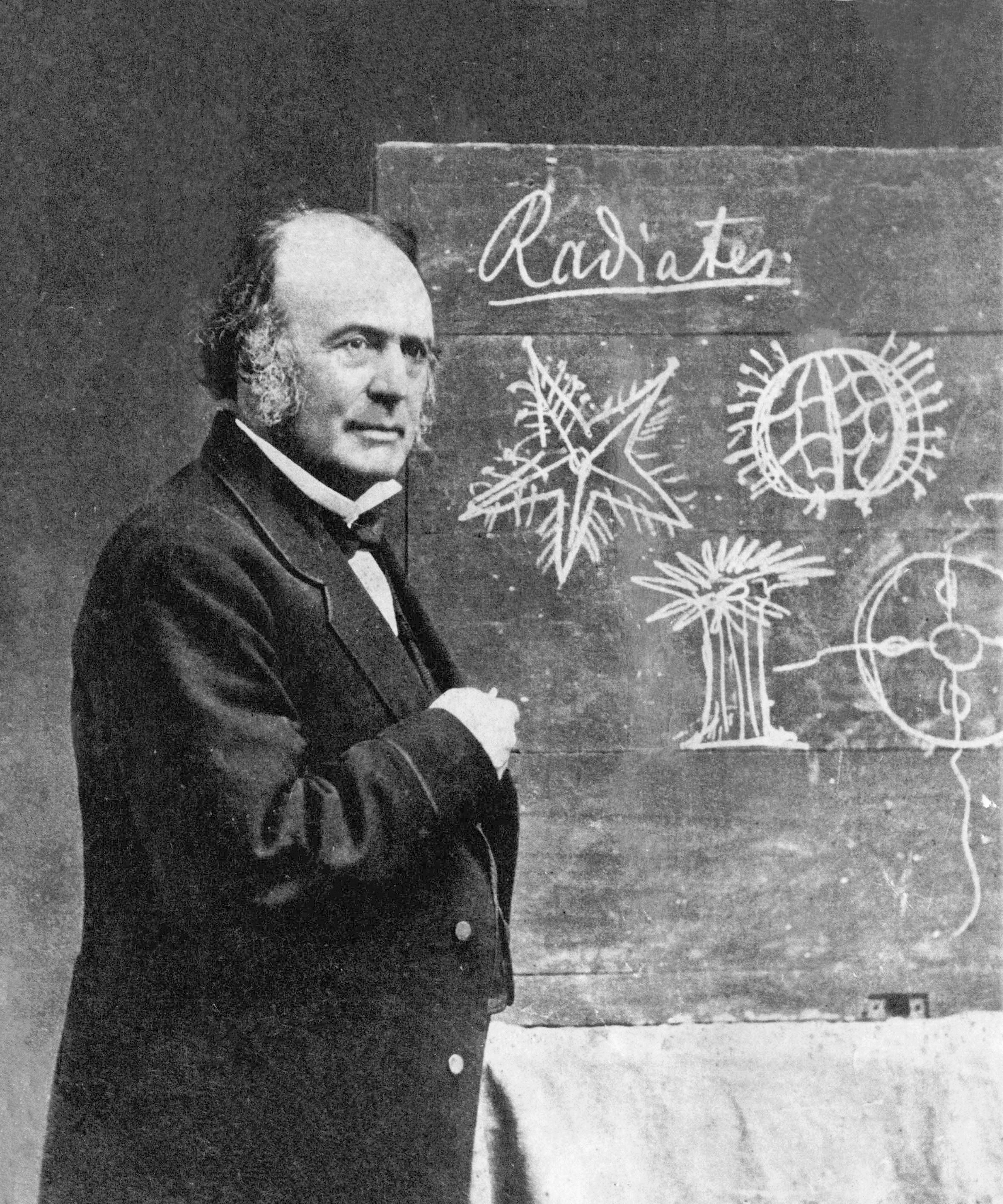
Louis Agassiz (here in 1870, with drawings of Radiata) believed in a sequence of creations in which humanity was the goal of a divine plan.

British science developed in the early 19th century on a basis of natural theology which saw the adaptation of fixed species as evidence that they had been specially created to a purposeful divine design. The philosophical concepts of German idealism inspired concepts of an ordered plan of harmonious creation, which Richard Owen reconciled with natural theology as a pattern of homology showing evidence of design. Similarly, Louis Agassiz saw Ernest Haeckel's recapitulation theory, which held that the embryological development of an organism repeats its evolutionary history, as symbolising a pattern of the sequence of creations in which humanity was the goal of a divine plan. In 1844 Vestiges adapted Agassiz's concept into theistic evolutionism. Its anonymous author Robert Chambers proposed a "law" of divinely ordered progressive development, with transmutation of species as an extension of recapitulation theory. This popularised the idea, but it was strongly condemned by the scientific establishment. Agassiz remained forcefully opposed to evolution, and after he moved to America in 1846 his idealist argument from design of orderly development became very influential. In 1858 Owen cautiously proposed that this development could be a real expression of a continuing creative law, but distanced himself from transmutationists. Two years later, in his review of On the Origin of Species, Owen attacked Darwin while at the same time openly supporting evolution, expressing belief in a pattern of transmutation by law-like means. This idealist argument from design was taken up by other naturalists such as George Jackson Mivart, and the Duke of Argyll who rejected natural selection altogether in favor of laws of development that guided evolution down preordained paths.

Many of Darwin's supporters accepted evolution on the basis that it could be reconciled with design. In particular, Asa Gray considered natural selection to be the main mechanism of evolution and sought to reconcile it with natural theology. He proposed that natural selection could be a mechanism in which the problem of evil of suffering produced the greater good of adaptation, but conceded that this had difficulties and suggested that God might influence the variations on which natural selection acted to guide evolution. For Darwin and Thomas Henry Huxley such pervasive supernatural influence was beyond scientific investigation, and George Frederick Wright, an ordained minister who was Gray's colleague in developing theistic evolution, emphasised the need to look for secondary or known causes rather than invoking supernatural explanations: "If we cease to observe this rule there is an end to all science and all sound science."

A secular version of this methodological naturalism was welcomed by a younger generation of scientists who sought to investigate natural causes of organic change, and rejected theistic evolution in science. By 1872 Darwinism in its broader sense of the fact of evolution was accepted as a starting point. Around 1890 only a few older men held onto the idea of design in science, and it had completely disappeared from mainstream scientific discussions by 1900. There was still unease about the implications of natural selection, and those seeking a purpose or direction in evolution turned to neo-Lamarckism or orthogenesis as providing natural explanations.

=== Neo-Lamarckism ===
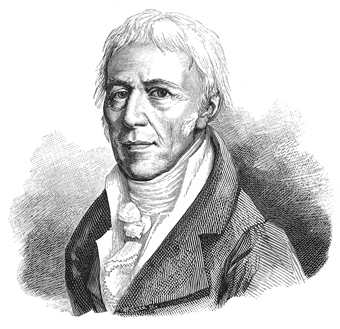
Jean-Baptiste Lamarck

Jean-Baptiste Lamarck had originally proposed a theory on the transmutation of species that was largely based on a progressive drive toward greater complexity. Lamarck also believed, as did many others in the 19th century, that characteristics acquired during the course of an organism's life could be inherited by the next generation, and he saw this as a secondary evolutionary mechanism that produced adaptation to the environment. Typically, such characteristics included changes caused by the use or disuse of a particular organ. It was this mechanism of evolutionary adaptation through the inheritance of acquired characteristics that much later came to be known as Lamarckism. Although Alfred Russel Wallace completely rejected the concept in favor of natural selection, Darwin always included what he called Effects of the increased Use and Disuse of Parts, as controlled by Natural Selection in On the Origin of Species, giving examples such as large ground feeding birds getting stronger legs through exercise, and weaker wings from not flying until, like the ostrich, they could not fly at all.

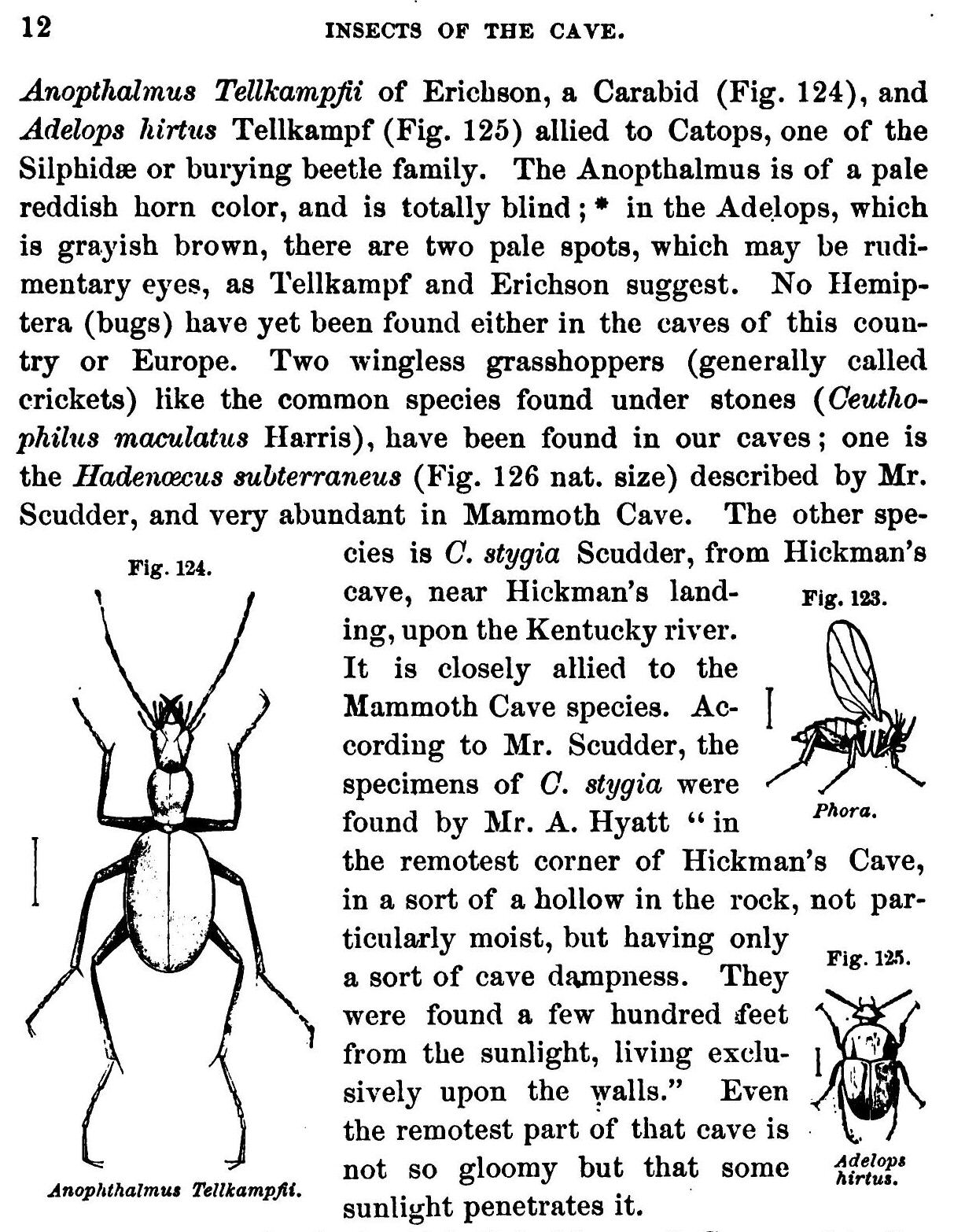
Alpheus Spring Packard's 1872 book Mammoth Cave and its Inhabitants used the example of cave beetles (Anophthalmus and Adelops) that had become blind to argue for Lamarckian evolution through inherited disuse of organs.

In the late 19th century the term neo-Lamarckism came to be associated with the position of naturalists who viewed the inheritance of acquired characteristics as the most important evolutionary mechanism. Advocates of this position included the British writer and Darwin critic Samuel Butler, the German biologist Ernst Haeckel, the American paleontologists Edward Drinker Cope and Alpheus Hyatt, and the American entomologist Alpheus Packard. They considered Lamarckism to be more progressive and thus philosophically superior to Darwin's idea of natural selection acting on random variation. Butler and Cope both believed that this allowed organisms to effectively drive their own evolution, since organisms that developed new behaviors would change the patterns of use of their organs and thus kick-start the evolutionary process. In addition, Cope and Haeckel both believed that evolution was a progressive process. The idea of linear progress was an important part of Haeckel's recapitulation theory. Cope and Hyatt looked for, and thought they found, patterns of linear progression in the fossil record. Packard argued that the loss of vision in the blind cave insects he studied was best explained through a Lamarckian process of atrophy through disuse combined with inheritance of acquired characteristics.

Many American proponents of neo-Lamarckism were strongly influenced by Louis Agassiz, and a number of them, including Hyatt and Packard, were his students. Agassiz had an idealistic view of nature, connected with natural theology, that emphasized the importance of order and pattern. Agassiz never accepted evolution; his followers did, but they continued his program of searching for orderly patterns in nature, which they considered to be consistent with divine providence, and preferred evolutionary mechanisms like neo-Lamarckism and orthogenesis that would be likely to produce them.

In Britain the botanist George Henslow, the son of Darwin's mentor John Stevens Henslow, was an important advocate of neo-Lamarckism. He studied how environmental stress affected the development of plants, and he wrote that the variations induced by such environmental factors could largely explain evolution. The historian of science Peter J. Bowler writes that, as was typical of many 19th century Lamarckians, Henslow did not appear to understand the need to demonstrate that such environmentally induced variations would be inherited by descendants that developed in the absence of the environmental factors that produced them, but merely assumed that they would be.

==== Polarising the argument: Weismann's germ plasm ====
August Weismann's germ plasm theory stated that the hereditary material is confined to the gonads. Somatic cells (of the body) develop afresh in each generation from the germ plasm, so changes to the body acquired during a lifetime cannot affect the next generation, as neo-Lamarckism required.

Critics of neo-Lamarckism pointed out that no one had ever produced solid evidence for the inheritance of acquired characteristics. The experimental work of the German biologist August Weismann resulted in the germ plasm theory of inheritance. This led him to declare that inheritance of acquired characteristics was impossible, since the Weismann barrier would prevent any changes that occurred to the body after birth from being inherited by the next generation. This effectively polarised the argument between the Darwinians and the neo-Lamarckians, as it forced people to choose whether to agree or disagree with Weismann and hence with evolution by natural selection. Despite Weismann's criticism, neo-Lamarckism remained the most popular alternative to natural selection at the end of the 19th century, and would remain the position of some naturalists well into the 20th century.

==== Baldwin effect ====
As a consequence of the debate over the viability of neo-Lamarckism, in 1896 James Mark Baldwin, Henry Fairfield Osborne and C. Lloyd Morgan all independently proposed a mechanism where new learned behaviors could cause the evolution of new instincts and physical traits through natural selection without resort to the inheritance of acquired characteristics. They proposed that if individuals in a species benefited from learning a particular new behavior, the ability to learn that behavior could be favored by natural selection, and the result would be the evolution of new instincts and eventually new physical adaptations. This became known as the Baldwin effect and it has remained a topic of debate and research in evolutionary biology ever since.

=== Orthogenesis ===
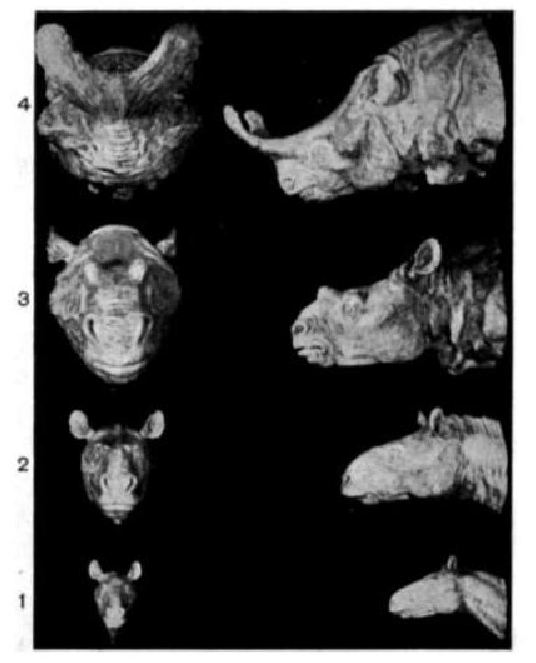
Henry Fairfield Osborn's 1918 book Origin and Evolution of Life claimed the evolution of Titanothere horns was an example of an orthogenetic trend in evolution.

Orthogenesis was the theory that life has an innate tendency to change, in a unilinear fashion in a particular direction. The term was popularized by Theodor Eimer, a German zoologist, in his 1898 book On Orthogenesis: And the Impotence of Natural Selection in Species Formation. He had studied the coloration of butterflies, and believed he had discovered non-adaptive features which could not be explained by natural selection. Eimer also believed in Lamarckian inheritance of acquired characteristics, but he felt that internal laws of growth determined which characteristics would be acquired and guided the long term direction of evolution down certain paths.

Orthogenesis had a significant following in the late 19th and early 20th centuries, its proponents including the Russian biologist Leo S. Berg, and the American paleontologist Henry Fairfield Osborn. Orthogenesis was particularly popular among some paleontologists, who believed that the fossil record showed patterns of gradual and constant unidirectional change. Those who accepted this idea, however, did not necessarily accept that the mechanism driving orthogenesis was teleological (goal-directed). They did believe that orthogenetic trends were non-adaptive; in fact they felt that in some cases they led to developments that were detrimental to the organism, such as the large antlers of the Irish elk that they believed led to the animal's extinction.

Support for orthogenesis began to decline during the modern synthesis in the 1940s, when it became apparent that orthogenesis could not explain the complex branching patterns of evolution revealed by statistical analysis of the fossil record by paleontologists. A few biologists however hung on to the idea of orthogenesis as late as the 1950s, claiming that the processes of macroevolution, the long term trends in evolution, were distinct from the processes of microevolution.

=== Mutationism ===
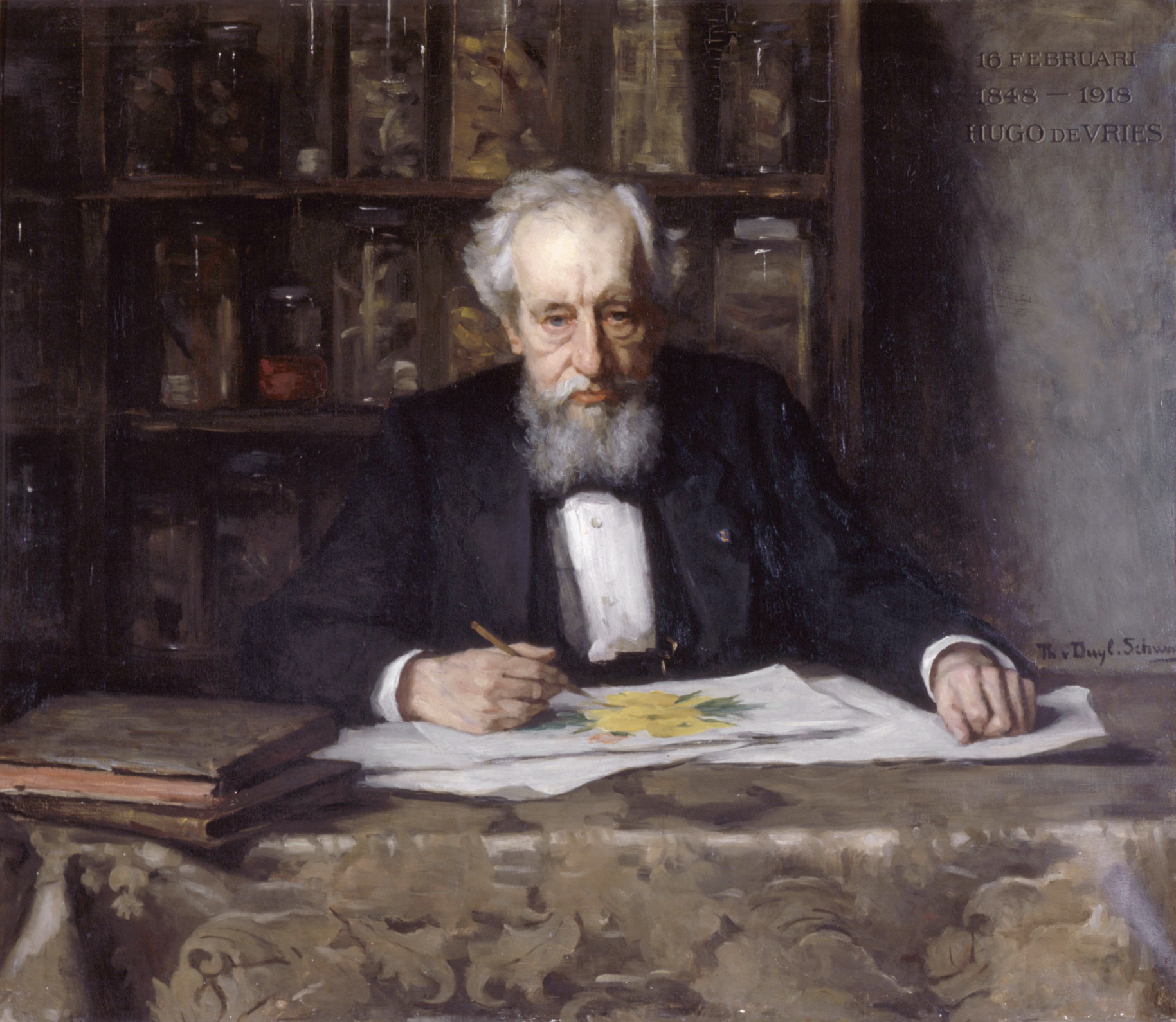
Painting of Hugo de Vries, making a painting of an evening primrose, the plant which had apparently produced new forms by large mutations in his experiments, by Thérèse Schwartze, 1918

Mutationism was the idea that new forms and species arose in a single step as a result of large mutations. It was seen as a much faster alternative to the Darwinian concept of a gradual process of small random variations being acted on by natural selection. It was popular with early geneticists such as Hugo de Vries, who along with Carl Correns helped rediscover Gregor Mendel's laws of inheritance in 1900, William Bateson a British zoologist who switched to genetics, and early in his career, Thomas Hunt Morgan.

The 1901 mutation theory of evolution held that species went through periods of rapid mutation, possibly as a result of environmental stress, that could produce multiple mutations, and in some cases completely new species, in a single generation. Its originator was the Dutch botanist Hugo de Vries. De Vries looked for evidence of mutation extensive enough to produce a new species in a single generation and thought he found it with his work breeding the evening primrose of the genus Oenothera, which he started in 1886. The plants that de Vries worked with seemed to be constantly producing new varieties with striking variations in form and color, some of which appeared to be new species because plants of the new generation could only be crossed with one another, not with their parents. DeVries himself allowed a role for natural selection in determining which new species would survive, but some geneticists influenced by his work, including Morgan, felt that natural selection was not necessary at all. De Vries's ideas were influential in the first two decades of the 20th century, as some biologists felt that mutation theory could explain the sudden emergence of new forms in the fossil record; research on Oenothera spread across the world. However, critics including many field naturalists wondered why no other organism seemed to show the same kind of rapid mutation.

Morgan was a supporter of de Vries's mutation theory and was hoping to gather evidence in favor of it when he started working with the fruit fly Drosophila melanogaster in his lab in 1907. However, it was a researcher in that lab, Hermann Joseph Muller, who determined in 1918 that the new varieties de Vries had observed while breeding Oenothera were the result of polyploid hybrids rather than rapid genetic mutation. While they were doubtful of the importance of natural selection, the work of geneticists like Morgan, Bateson, de Vries and others from 1900 to 1915 established Mendelian genetics linked to chromosomal inheritance, which validated August Weismann's criticism of neo-Lamarckian evolution by discounting the inheritance of acquired characteristics. The work in Morgan's lab with Drosophila also undermined the concept of orthogenesis by demonstrating the random nature of mutation.

== End of the eclipse ==
Several major ideas about evolution came together in the population genetics of the early 20th century to form the modern synthesis, including competition for resources, genetic variation, natural selection, and particulate (Mendelian) inheritance. This ended the eclipse of Darwinism.

During the period 1916–1932, the discipline of population genetics developed largely through the work of the geneticists Ronald Fisher, J.B.S. Haldane, and Sewall Wright. Their work recognized that the vast majority of mutations produced small effects that served to increase the genetic variability of a population rather than creating new species in a single step as the mutationists assumed. They were able to produce statistical models of population genetics that included Darwin's concept of natural selection as the driving force of evolution.

Developments in genetics persuaded field naturalists such as Bernhard Rensch and Ernst Mayr to abandon neo-Lamarckian ideas about evolution in the early 1930s. By the late 1930s, Mayr and Theodosius Dobzhansky had synthesized the ideas of population genetics with the knowledge of field naturalists about the amount of genetic diversity in wild populations, and the importance of genetically distinct subpopulations (especially when isolated from one another by geographical barriers) to create the early 20th century modern synthesis. In 1944 George Gaylord Simpson integrated paleontology into the synthesis by statistically analyzing the fossil record to show that it was consistent with the branching non-directional form of evolution predicted by the synthesis, and in particular that the linear trends cited by earlier paleontologists in support of Lamarckism and orthogenesis did not stand up to careful analysis. Mayr wrote that by the end of the synthesis natural selection together with chance mechanisms like genetic drift had become the universal explanation for evolutionary change.

== Historiography ==
The concept of eclipse suggests that Darwinian research paused, implying in turn that there had been a preceding period of vigorously Darwinian activity among biologists. However, historians of science such as Mark Largent have argued that while biologists broadly accepted the extensive evidence for evolution presented in The Origin of Species, there was less enthusiasm for natural selection as a mechanism. Biologists instead looked for alternative explanations more in keeping with their worldviews, which included the beliefs that evolution must be directed and that it constituted a form of progress. Further, the idea of a dark eclipse period was convenient to scientists such as Julian Huxley, who wished to paint the modern synthesis as a bright new achievement, and accordingly to depict the preceding period as dark and confused. Huxley's 1942 book Evolution: The Modern Synthesis therefore, argued Largent, suggested that the so-called modern synthesis began after a long period of eclipse lasting until the 1930s, in which Mendelians, neo-Lamarckians, mutationists, and Weismannians, not to mention experimental embryologists and Haeckelian recapitulationists fought running battles with each other. The idea of an eclipse also allowed Huxley to step aside from what was to him the inconvenient association of evolution with aspects such as social Darwinism, eugenics, imperialism, and militarism. Accounts such as Michael Ruse's very large book Monad to Man ignored, claimed Largent, almost all the early 20th century American evolutionary biologists. Largent has suggested as an alternative to eclipse a biological metaphor, the interphase of Darwinism, interphase being an apparently quiet period in the cycle of cell division and growth.

In 2024, Michał J. Wagner argues that the eclipse of Darwinism was a theoretical crisis rather than a historiographical construct. In Revisiting the Eclipse of Darwinism, Wagner writes that the decline of confidence in Darwinism resulted from unresolved philosophical tensions within the theory itself, particularly concerning ontology, causation, and standards of scientific explanation. In his view, tensions between population-based evolutionary explanations and residual essentialist assumptions limited the explanatory scope of natural selection, especially with respect to heredity, variation, and evolutionary direction. On this view, alternative evolutionary theories of the late nineteenth and early twentieth centuries emerged as responses to these internal difficulties, and the modern synthesis represented not simply a revival of Darwinism but a reconfiguration of its conceptual foundations.

== See also ==
- Coloration evidence for natural selection
- Objections to evolution

== Sources ==
- Bowler, Peter J. (2003). Evolution:The History of an Idea. University of California Press. ISBN 0-520-23693-9.
- Bowler, Peter J. (1983). The Eclipse of Darwinism: anti-Darwinian evolutionary theories in the decades around 1900. Johns Hopkins University Press. ISBN 978-0-8018-4391-4.
- Darwin, Charles (1872). The Origin of Species by Means of Natural Selection, or the Preservation of Favored Races in the Struggle for Life (6th ed.). London: John Murray. ISBN 1-904633-78-1.
- Endersby, Jim (2007). A Guinea Pig's History of Biology. Harvard University Press. ISBN 978-0-674-02713-8.
- Huxley, Julian (1942). Evolution: the modern synthesis. London: Allen & Unwin.
- Larson, Edward J. (2004). Evolution:The Remarkable History of a Scientific Theory. Modern Library. ISBN 0-679-64288-9.
- Mayr, Ernst; Provine, W. B., eds. (1998). The Evolutionary Synthesis: Perspectives on the Unification of Biology. Harvard University Press. ISBN 0-674-27225-0.
- Quammen, David (2006). The Reluctant Mr. Darwin. Atlas Books. ISBN 0-393-05981-2.
- Ruse, Michael (1996). Monad to Man: The Concept of Progress in Evolutionary Biology. Harvard University Press. ISBN 978-0-674-03248-4.
- Secord, James A. (2001). Victorian Sensation: The Extraordinary Publication, Reception, and Secret Authorship of Vestiges of the Natural History of Creation. University of Chicago Press. ISBN 978-0-226-74410-0.
