= TCAIM =

Protein-coding gene in the species Homo sapiens

Identifiers
- Aliases: TCAIM, C3orf23, TOAG-1, TOAG1, T-cell activation inhibitor, mitochondrial, T cell activation inhibitor, mitochondrial
- External IDs: MGI: 1196217; HomoloGene: 45481; GeneCards: TCAIM; OMA:TCAIM - orthologs

Gene location (Human)
Chr.	Chromosome 3 (human)
Band	3p21.31	Start	44,338,119 bp
Band	3p21.31	End	44,409,451 bp

Gene location (Mouse)
Chr.	Chromosome 9 (mouse)
Band	9 F4|9 73.14 cM	Start	122,634,604 bp
Band	9 F4|9 73.14 cM	End	122,665,399 bp
RNA expression pattern
Bgee	Human / Mouse (ortholog); Top expressed in: right lobe of liver; muscle of thigh; C1 segment; islet of Langerhans; ventricular zone; gastrocnemius muscle; ganglionic eminence; gonad; deltoid muscle; secondary oocyte / Top expressed in: interventricular septum; temporal muscle; digastric muscle; secondary oocyte; myocardium of ventricle; extraocular muscle; soleus muscle; sternocleidomastoid muscle; zygote; primary oocyte; More reference expression data
BioGPS	n/a
Orthologs
Species	Human	Mouse
Entrez	285343	382117
Ensembl	ENSG00000179152	ENSMUSG00000046603
UniProt	Q8N3R3	Q66JZ4
RefSeq (mRNA)	NM_001029839; NM_001029840; NM_001282913; NM_001282914; NM_001282915 NM_173826	NM_001013405
RefSeq (protein)	NP_001025010; NP_001025011; NP_001269842; NP_001269843; NP_001269844 NP_776187	NP_001013423
Location (UCSC)	Chr 3: 44.34 – 44.41 Mb	Chr 9: 122.63 – 122.67 Mb
PubMed search
- Wikidata
View/Edit Human	View/Edit Mouse

TCAIM is a protein that in humans is encoded by the TCAIM gene (T-cell activation inhibitor, mitochondrial).

== Gene ==
The gene is located on chromosome 3, at position 3p21.31, and is 71,333 bases long. A graphic of the image is show below in Fig.1.2 The TCAIM protein is 496 residues long and weighs 57925 Da. It exists in four different isoforms. TCAIM is highly conserved among different species, but no homologies to protein families of known functions were discovered.

=== Transcript ===
There are 8 alternatively spliced exons, which encode 4 transcript variants. The primary transcript, which is 3520 bp, is well conserved among orthologs, with the human isoform 1 having high identity with orthologous proteins. The X1 transcript contains 11 exons, which yield a polypeptide that is 496 amino acid residues in length.

== Protein ==
=== General properties ===
Property	Pre-Protein	Cleaved Protein	Mature Protein
Amino Acid Length	496	470	470
Isoelectric Point	8.7	8.5	8.2-8.6
Molecular Weight	58 kdal	55 kdal	~55-57

The isoelectric point is significantly greater than average for human proteins (6.81).

=== Structure ===
Shown to the right is a predicted tertiary structure of the protein. It is composed mostly of long alpha-helices with several coil regions and strands dispersed throughout the length of the protein. The ends of the protein consist of coil regions opposite the N- and C- terminal ends.

=== Expression ===
TCAIM is moderately expressed (50-75%) in most tissues in the body. However, a study on NCBI GEO discussing the effect of disease states on TCAIM mRNA expression found that protein expression was actually elevated in HPV positive tissues compared to the HPV negative tissues. Another study found that TCAIM expression was elevated in individuals with Type 2 diabetes and insulin resistance. The expression of TCAIM seems to be contingent on the specific disease state in a variety of cases.

=== Subcellular localization ===
The protein contains a mitochondrial signal peptide localizing it to the mitochondrial matrix. Analysis via the EXPASY localization software confirmed this finding. The high isoelectric point of the Human protein provides further evidence for the mitochondrial localization due to the high pH of the mitochondrial matrix.

=== Post-translational modifications ===
==== Cleavage sites ====
The protein is initially cleaved to remove the 26 amino acids from the N-terminus. This represents a signal peptide after it is localized to the mitochondrion.

==== Phosphorylation ====
There are a number of predicted phosphorylation sites, as see in the figure to the right. Serine residues are more likely to undergo phosphorylation than threonine or tyrosine residues.

==== O-linked glycosylation ====
Shown to the right are a number of predicted o-linked sites. None have been experimentally determined thus far.

== Homology and Evolution ==
=== Homologs ===
An alignment of Homo sapiens TCAIM and Danio rerio (Zebrafish) homologs was performed using the SDSC workbench. There is approximately 55% identity between the two orthologs, with a global alignment score of 1817. The two orthologs are consistently similar throughout the entirety of their sequences. The differences between the two genes is due seemingly random segments of non-conserved and semiconserved residues scattered throughout the two alignments. This difference may be due to the non-relatedness between the two organisms.

=== Evolutionary history ===
TCAIM diverged much quicker than cytochrome C, but slightly slower than fibrinogen.

== Function ==
Not much is known about the function; it is surmised that this protein may play a role in apoptosis of T-cells. TCAIM may play a role in the innate immune signaling via the mitochondria.

== Clinical significance ==
A research study was performed by Vogel et al. They previously found that TCAIM is highly expressed in grafts and tissues of tolerance-developing transplant patients and that the protein is localized in the mitochondria. In this study, they found that TCAIM interacts with and is regulated by CD11c(+) dendritic cells. Another article by Hendrikson et. el briefly mentions TCAIM. They found that genetic variants in nuclear-encoded mitochondrial genes influence AIDS progression. The third article is another research that finds evidence that TCAIM (along with mitochondrial genes) could be used as a marker in patients to predict whether they could accept an allograft or reject it.
