= Michael Ruse =

Canadian philosopher (1940–2024)

Michael Escott Ruse
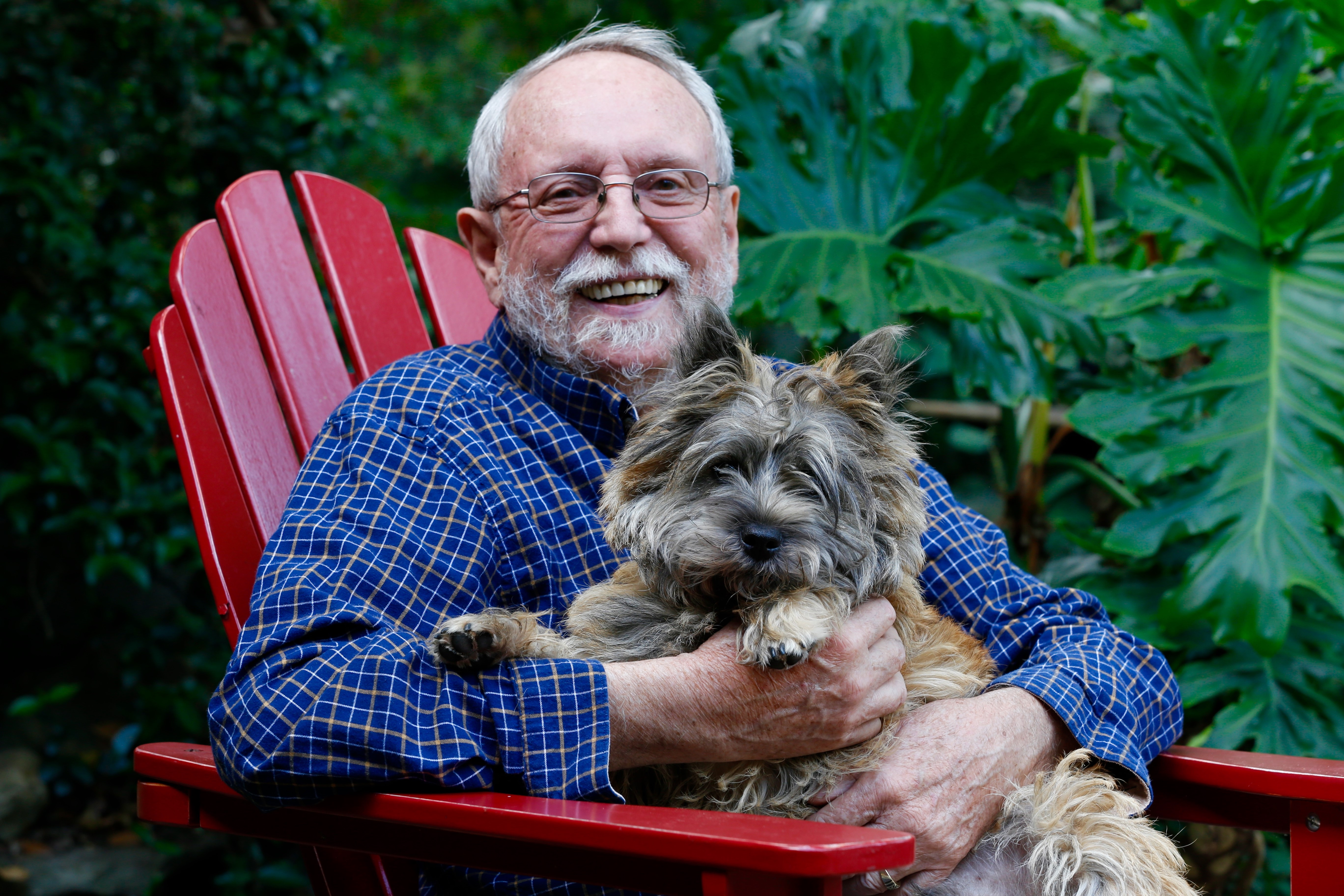
- Ruse in 2020
- Born: 21 June 1940; Birmingham, England
- Died: 1 November 2024 (aged 84)

Education
- Education: University of Bristol; McMaster University

Philosophical work
- Era: Contemporary philosophy
- Region: Western Philosophy
- School: Analytic philosophy
- Institutions: Florida State University (2000–2024); University of Guelph (1965–2000)
- Doctoral students: David Castle
- Main interests: Philosophy of biology Philosophy of science
- Notable ideas: Orthogenesis as the view that evolution has a kind of momentum of its own that carries organisms along certain tracks

Michael Escott Ruse FRSC (21 June 1940 – 1 November 2024) was a British-born Canadian philosopher of science who specialised in the philosophy of biology and worked on the relationship between science and religion, the creation–evolution controversy, and the demarcation problem within science. Ruse began his career teaching at the University of Guelph and spent many years at Florida State University.

== Early life and career ==
Ruse was born in Birmingham, England, attending Bootham School, York. He received an undergraduate degree from the University of Bristol (1962), his master's degree at McMaster University, Hamilton, Ontario (1964), and a Ph.D. from the University of Bristol (1970).

Ruse taught at the University of Guelph in Ontario, Canada for 35 years. Since his retirement from Guelph, he had taught at Florida State University and was the Lucyle T. Werkmeister Professor of Philosophy (2000–20??). In 1986, he was elected as a Fellow of both the Royal Society of Canada and the American Association for the Advancement of Science. He received honorary doctorates from the University of Bergen, Norway (1990), McMaster University, Ontario, Canada (2003) and the University of New Brunswick, Fredericton, New Brunswick, Canada (2007). In September 2014 he was made an Honorary Doctor of Science by University College London.

Ruse was a key witness for the plaintiff in the 1981 test case (McLean v. Arkansas) of the state law permitting the teaching of "creation science" in the Arkansas school system. The federal judge ruled that the state law was unconstitutional.

His 1996 book on the idea of progress in biology (orthogenesis), Monad to Man, had a mixed reception from other philosophers of biology. Peter J. Bowler described it as an important and controversial book on the status of evolutionism. Ron Amundson called Ruse an analytic and empiricist philosopher, but found Ruse's handling of structuralism "less satisfactory" than of the adaptationist, Darwinian traditions. He called Ruse's writing style "bluff, unselfconscious, and opinionated" and finds Ruse sarcastic, "scarcely a neutral observer". Michael Ghiselin criticised Ruse as a "politically correct" "academic bigot", disagreed with Ruse's narrative about phylogenetics, and accused him of "completely ignor[ing] recent work such as by Carl Woese, "neglect[ing] data" that contradict his thesis. Ironically, in Ghiselin's view, Ruse's own epistemological ideal for science relied on the idea of Progress.

Ruse delivered some of the 2001 Gifford Lectures in Natural Theology at the University of Glasgow. His lectures on Evolutionary Naturalism, "A Darwinian Understanding of Epistemology" and "A Darwinian Understanding of Ethics," are collected in The Nature and Limits of Human Understanding (ed. Anthony Sanford, T & T Clark, 2003). Ruse debated regularly with William A. Dembski, a proponent of intelligent design. Ruse takes the position that it is possible to reconcile the Christian faith with evolutionary theory. Ruse founded the journal Biology and Philosophy, of which he was emeritus Editor, and had published numerous books and articles. He cited the influence of his late colleague Ernan McMullin.

From 2013, Ruse was listed on the Advisory Council of the National Center for Science Education.

In 2014, Ruse was named the Bertrand Russell Society's award winner for his dedication to science and reason.

Ruse sought to reconcile science and religion, a position which brought him into conflict with Richard Dawkins and Pharyngula science blogger PZ Myers. Ruse had engaged in heated exchanges with new atheists. According to Ruse in 2009, "Richard Dawkins, in his best selling The God Delusion, likens me to Neville Chamberlain, the pusillanimous appeaser of Hitler at Munich. Jerry Coyne reviewed one of my books (Can a Darwinian be a Christian?) using the Orwellian quote that only an intellectual could believe the nonsense I believe in. And non-stop blogger P. Z. Myers has referred to me as a 'clueless gobshite.'" Ruse said new atheists do the side of science a "grave disservice", a "disservice to scholarship", and that "Dawkins in The God Delusion would fail any introductory philosophy or religion course", and that The God Delusion makes him "ashamed to be an atheist". Ruse concluded, saying "I am proud to be the focus of the invective of the new atheists. They are a bloody disaster".

== Personal life and death ==
Ruse had two children from his first marriage, and was married to his second wife from 1985, with whom he had three children. Ruse died on 1 November 2024, at the age of 84.

== Selected works ==
- The Darwinian revolution (1979) ISBN 0-226-73164-2
- Is science sexist? and other problems in the biomedical sciences (1981) ISBN 90-277-1250-6
- Darwinism defended, a guide to the evolution controversies (1982) ISBN 0-201-06273-9
- Sociobiology, sense or nonsense? (1st ed. 1979, 2nd ed. 1985) ISBN 90-277-1798-2
- Taking Darwin seriously: a naturalistic approach to philosophy (1986) ISBN 0-631-13542-1
- Homosexuality: A Philosophical Inquiry (1988) ISBN 0-631-17553-9
- The Philosophy of biology today (1988) ISBN 0-88706-911-8
- The Darwinian paradigm: essays on its history, philosophy and religious implications (1989) ISBN 0-415-08951-4
- Evolution: The First Four Billion Years. (edited with Michael Travis) (2009) ISBN 978-0-674-03175-3
- Evolutionary naturalism: selected essays (1995) ISBN 0-415-08997-2
- Monad to man: the concept of progress in evolutionary biology (1996) ISBN 0-674-58220-9
- But is it science? the philosophical question in the creation/evolution controversy (1996) (ed.) ISBN 0-87975-439-7
- Mystery of mysteries: is evolution a social construction? (1999) ISBN 0-674-00543-0
- Biology and the foundation of ethics (1999) ISBN 0-521-55923-5
- Can a Darwinian be a Christian? the relationship between science and religion (2001) ISBN 0-521-63716-3
- The evolution wars: a guide to the debates (2003) ISBN 1-57607-185-5
- Darwin and Design: Does evolution have a purpose? (2003) ISBN 0-674-01631-9
- Darwinian Heresies (edited with Abigail Lustig and Robert J. Richards) (2004) ISBN 0521815169
- The Evolution-Creation Struggle (2005) ISBN 0-674-01687-4
- Darwinism and its Discontents (2006) ISBN 0-521-82947-X
- Cambridge Companion to the Origin of Species (edited with Robert J. Richards) (2008) ISBN 978-0-521-87079-5
- Philosophy after Darwin (2009) ISBN 0-691-13553-3
- Defining Darwin: Essays on the History and Philosophy of Evolutionary Biology (2009) ISBN 1-59102-725-X
- Science and Spirituality: Making room for faith in the age of science (2010) ISBN 0-521-75594-8
- The Philosophy of Human Evolution (2012) ISBN 0-521-11793-3
- The Gaia Hypothesis: Science on a Pagan Planet (2013) ISBN 978-0226731704
- Atheism: What Everyone Needs to Know (2015) ISBN 0-199-33458-7
- Darwinism as Religion: What Literature Tells Us about Evolution (2016) Oxford University Press
- On Purpose (2018) Princeton University Press
- Why We Hate: Understanding the Roots of Human Conflict (2022) Oxford University Press ISBN 0-197-62128-7
- Understanding the Christianity–Evolution Relationship (Understanding Life) (2023) Cambridge University Press ISBN 9781009277334

== Sources ==
- Ruse, Michael (1996). Monad to man: the Concept of Progress in Evolutionary Biology. Harvard University Press. ISBN 978-0-674-03248-4.
