= Function (biology) =

Reason for a change under natural selection; in physiology, what a system does

In evolutionary biology, function is the reason some object or process occurred in a system that evolved through natural selection. That reason is typically that it achieves some result, such as that chlorophyll helps to capture the energy of sunlight in photosynthesis. Hence, the organism that contains it is more likely to survive and reproduce, in other words the function increases the organism's fitness. A characteristic that assists in evolution is called an adaptation; other characteristics may be non-functional spandrels, though these in turn may later be co-opted by evolution to serve new functions.

In biology, function has been defined in many ways. In physiology, it is simply what an organ, tissue, cell or molecule does.

In the philosophy of biology, talk of function inevitably suggests some kind of teleological purpose, even though natural selection operates without any goal for the future. All the same, biologists often use teleological language as a shorthand for function. In contemporary philosophy of biology, there are three major accounts of function in the biological world: theories of causal role, selected effect, and goal contribution.

== In pre-evolutionary biology ==
In physiology, a function is an activity or process carried out by a system in an organism, such as sensation or locomotion in an animal. This concept of function as opposed to form (respectively Aristotle's ergon and morphê) was central in biological explanations in classical antiquity. In more modern times it formed part of the 1830 Cuvier–Geoffroy debate, where Cuvier argued that an animal's structure was driven by its functional needs, while Geoffroy proposed that each animal's structure was modified from a common plan.

== In evolutionary biology ==
Function can be defined in a variety of ways, including as adaptation, as contributing to evolutionary fitness, in animal behaviour, and, as discussed below, also as some kind of causal role or goal in the philosophy of biology.

=== Adaptation ===
A functional characteristic is known in evolutionary biology as an adaptation, and the research strategy for investigating whether a character is adaptive is known as adaptationism. Although assuming that a character is functional may be helpful in research, some characteristics of organisms are non-functional, formed as accidental spandrels, side effects of neighbouring functional systems.

=== Natural selection ===
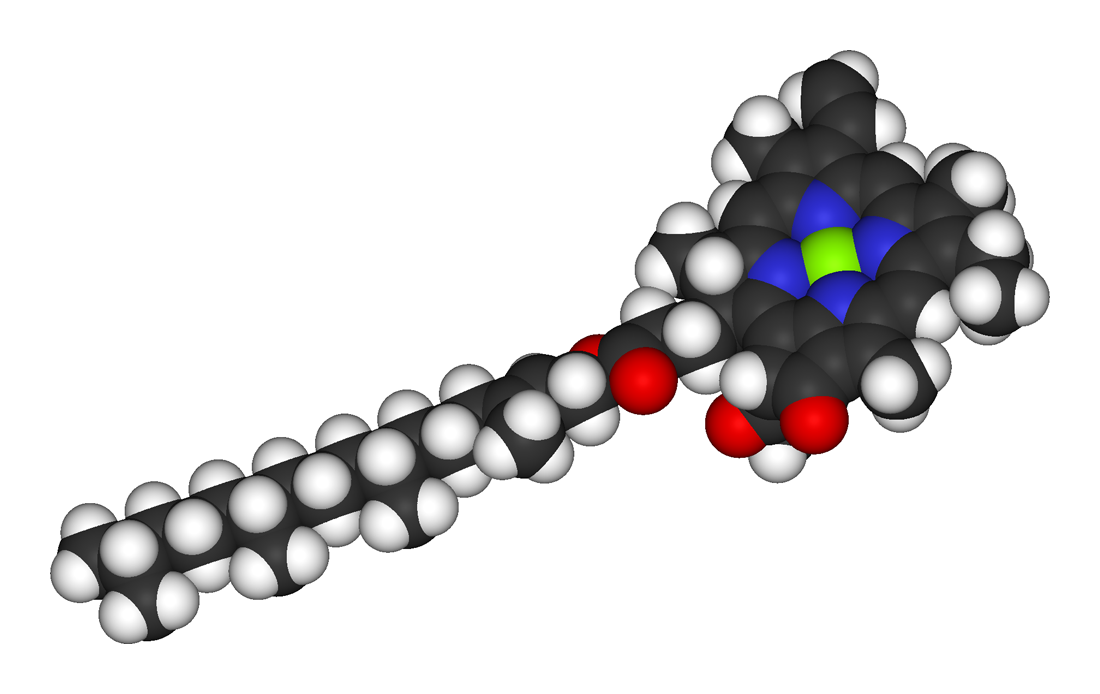
Chlorophyll molecule has a function in photosynthesis.

From the point of view of natural selection, biological functions exist to contribute to fitness, increasing the chance that an organism will survive to reproduce. For example, the function of chlorophyll in a plant is to capture the energy of sunlight for photosynthesis, which contributes to evolutionary success.

== In ethology ==
The ethologist Niko Tinbergen named four questions, based on Aristotle's Four Causes, that a biologist could ask to help explain a behaviour, though they have been generalised to a wider scope. 1) Mechanism: What mechanisms cause the animal to behave as it does? 2) Ontogeny: What developmental mechanisms in the animal's embryology (and its youth, if it learns) created the structures that cause the behaviour? 3) Function/adaptation: What is the evolutionary function of the behaviour? 4) Evolution: What is the phylogeny of the behaviour, or in other words, when did it first appear in the evolutionary history of the animal? The questions are interdependent, so that, for example, adaptive function is constrained by embryonic development.

== In philosophy of biology ==
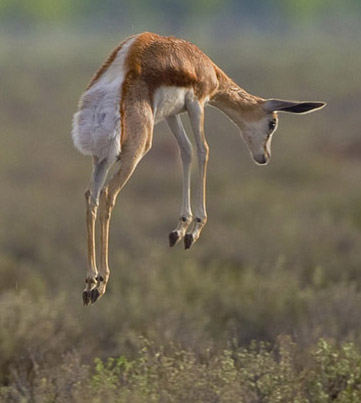
"Behaviour with a purpose": a young springbok stotting. A philosopher of biology might argue that this has the function of signalling to predators, helping the springbok to survive and allowing it to reproduce.

Function is not the same as purpose in the teleological sense, that is, possessing conscious mental intention to achieve a goal. In the philosophy of biology, evolution is a blind process which has no 'goal' for the future. For example, a tree does not grow flowers for any purpose, but does so simply because it has evolved to do so. To say 'a tree grows flowers to attract pollinators' would be incorrect if the 'to' implies purpose. A function describes what something does, not what its 'purpose' is. However, teleological language is often used by biologists as a shorthand way of describing function, even though its applicability is disputed.

In contemporary philosophy of biology, there are three major accounts of function in the biological world: theories of causal role, selected effect, and goal contribution.

=== Causal role ===
Causal role theories of biological function trace their origin back to a 1975 paper by Robert Cummins. Cummins defines the functional role of a component of a system to be the causal effect that the component has on the larger containing system. For example, the heart has the actual causal role of pumping blood in the circulatory system; therefore, the function of the heart is to pump blood. This account has been objected to on the grounds that it is too loose a notion of function. For example, the heart also has the causal effect of producing a sound, but we would not consider producing sound to be the function of the heart.

=== Selected effect ===
Selected effect theories of biological functions hold that the function of a biological trait is the function that the trait was selected for, as argued by Ruth Millikan. For example, the function of the heart is pumping blood, for that is the action for which the heart was selected for by evolution. In other words, pumping blood is the reason that the heart has evolved. This account has been criticized for being too restrictive a notion of function. It is not always clear which behavior has contributed to the selection of a trait, as biological traits can have functions, even if they have not been selected for. Beneficial mutations are initially not selected for, but they do have functions.

=== Goal contribution ===
Goal contribution theories seek to carve a middle ground between causal role and selected effect theories, as with Boorse (1977). Boorse defines the function of a biological trait to be the statistically typical causal contribution of that trait to survival and reproduction. So for example, zebra stripes were sometimes said to work by confusing predators. This role of zebra stripes would contribute to the survival and reproduction of zebras, and that is why confusing predators would be said to be the function of zebra stripes. Under this account, whether or not a particular causal role of a trait is its function depends on whether that causal role contributes to the survival and reproduction of that organism.

== See also ==
- Preadaptation
