= Teleology in biology =

Use of language of goal-directedness in the context of evolutionary adaptation

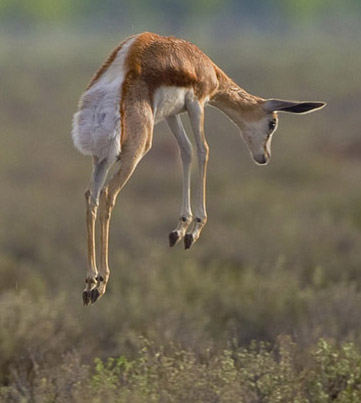
"Behaviour with a purpose": a young springbok stotting. A biologist might argue that this has the function of signalling to predators, helping the springbok to survive and allowing it to reproduce.

Teleology in biology is the use of the language of goal-directedness in accounts of evolutionary adaptation, which some biologists and philosophers of science find problematic. The term teleonomy has also been proposed. Before Darwin, organisms were seen as existing because God had designed and created them; their features such as eyes were taken by natural theology to have been made to enable them to carry out their functions, such as seeing. Evolutionary biologists often use similar teleological formulations that invoke purpose, but these imply natural selection rather than actual goals, whether conscious or not. Some biologists and religious thinkers held that evolution itself was somehow goal-directed (orthogenesis), and in vitalist versions, driven by a purposeful life force. With evolution working by natural selection acting on inherited variation, the use of teleology in biology has attracted criticism, and attempts have been made to teach students to avoid teleological language.

Nevertheless, biologists still often write about evolution as if organisms had goals, and some philosophers of biology such as Francisco Ayala and biologists such as J. B. S. Haldane consider that teleological language is unavoidable in evolutionary biology.

== Context ==
=== Teleology ===
Teleology (Greek τέλος, telos "end, purpose" and -λογία, logia, "a branch of learning") was coined by the philosopher Christian von Wolff in 1728. The concept derives from the ancient Greek philosophy of Aristotle, where the final cause (the purpose) of a thing is its function. However, Aristotle's biology does not envisage evolution by natural selection.

Phrases used by biologists like "a function of ... is to ..." or "is designed for" are teleological at least in language. The presence of real or apparent teleology in explanations of natural selection is a controversial aspect of the philosophy of biology, not least for its echoes of natural theology.

=== Natural theology ===
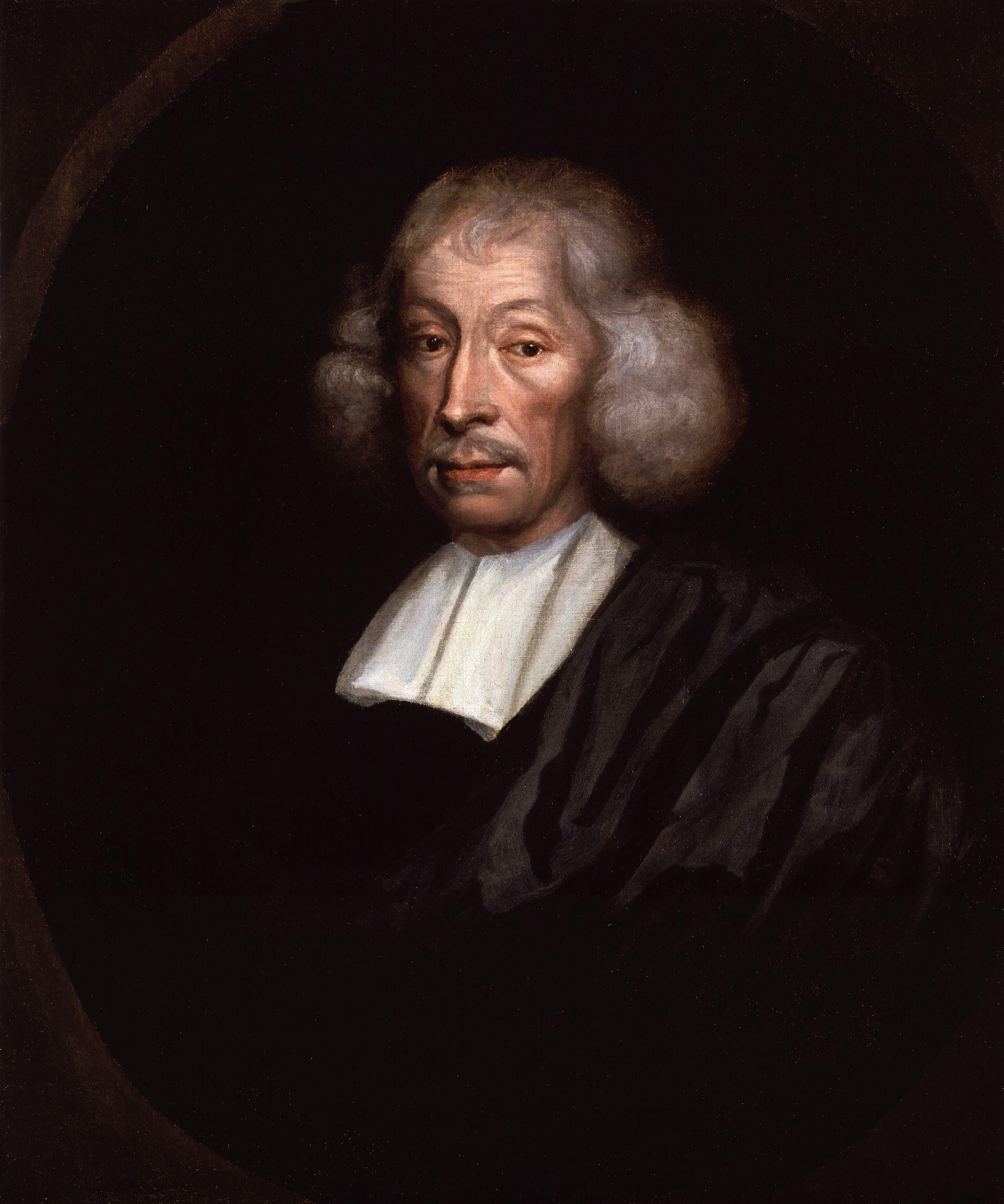
The English natural theologian John Ray, and later William Derham, used teleological arguments to illustrate the glory of God from nature.

Before Darwin, natural theology both assumed the existence of God and used the appearance of function in nature to argue for the existence of God. The English parson-naturalist John Ray stated that his intention was "to illustrate the glory of God in the knowledge of the works of nature or creation". Natural theology presented forms of the teleological argument or argument from design, namely that organs functioned well for their apparent purpose, so they were well-designed, so they must have been designed by a benevolent creator. For example, the eye had the function of seeing, and contained features like the iris and lens that assisted with seeing; therefore, ran the argument, it had been designed for that purpose.

Immanuel Kant agreed that living things are built with a design, but as nature lacks a designer, it could only mean, as he argued in his book Thoughts on the True Estimation of Living Forces, that living beings are naturally teleological and incapable of being explained purely by a framework of forces like Newton's laws of motion.

=== Goal-directed evolution ===
Religious thinkers and biologists have supposed that evolution was driven by some kind of life force, a philosophy known as vitalism, and have often supposed that it had some kind of goal or direction (towards which the life force was striving, if they also believed in that), known as orthogenesis or evolutionary progress. Such goal-directedness implies a long-term teleological force; some supporters of orthogenesis considered it to be a spiritual force, while others held that it was purely biological. For example, the embryologist Karl Ernst von Baer believed in a teleological force in nature, whereas the spiritualist philosopher Henri Bergson linked orthogenesis with vitalism, arguing for a creative force in evolution known as élan vital in his book Creative Evolution (1907). The biophysicist Pierre Lecomte du Noüy and the botanist Edmund Ware Sinnott developed vitalist evolutionary philosophies known as telefinalism and telism, respectively. Their views were heavily criticized as non-scientific; the palaeontologist George Gaylord Simpson argued that Du Noüy and Sinnott were promoting religious versions of evolution. The Jesuit paleontologist Pierre Teilhard de Chardin argued that evolution was aiming for a supposed spiritual "Omega Point" in what he called "directed additivity". With the emergence of the modern evolutionary synthesis, in which the genetic mechanisms of evolution were discovered, the hypothesis of orthogenesis was largely abandoned by biologists, especially with Ronald Fisher's argument in his 1930 book The Genetical Theory of Natural Selection.

=== Natural selection ===
Natural selection, introduced in 1859 as the central mechanism (Note: Darwin also introduced a second mechanism, sexual selection, to explain traits such as the colourful "tail" train of the peacock.) of evolution by Charles Darwin, is the differential survival and reproduction of individuals due to differences in phenotype. The mechanism directly implies evolution, a change in heritable traits of a population over time.

=== Adaptation ===
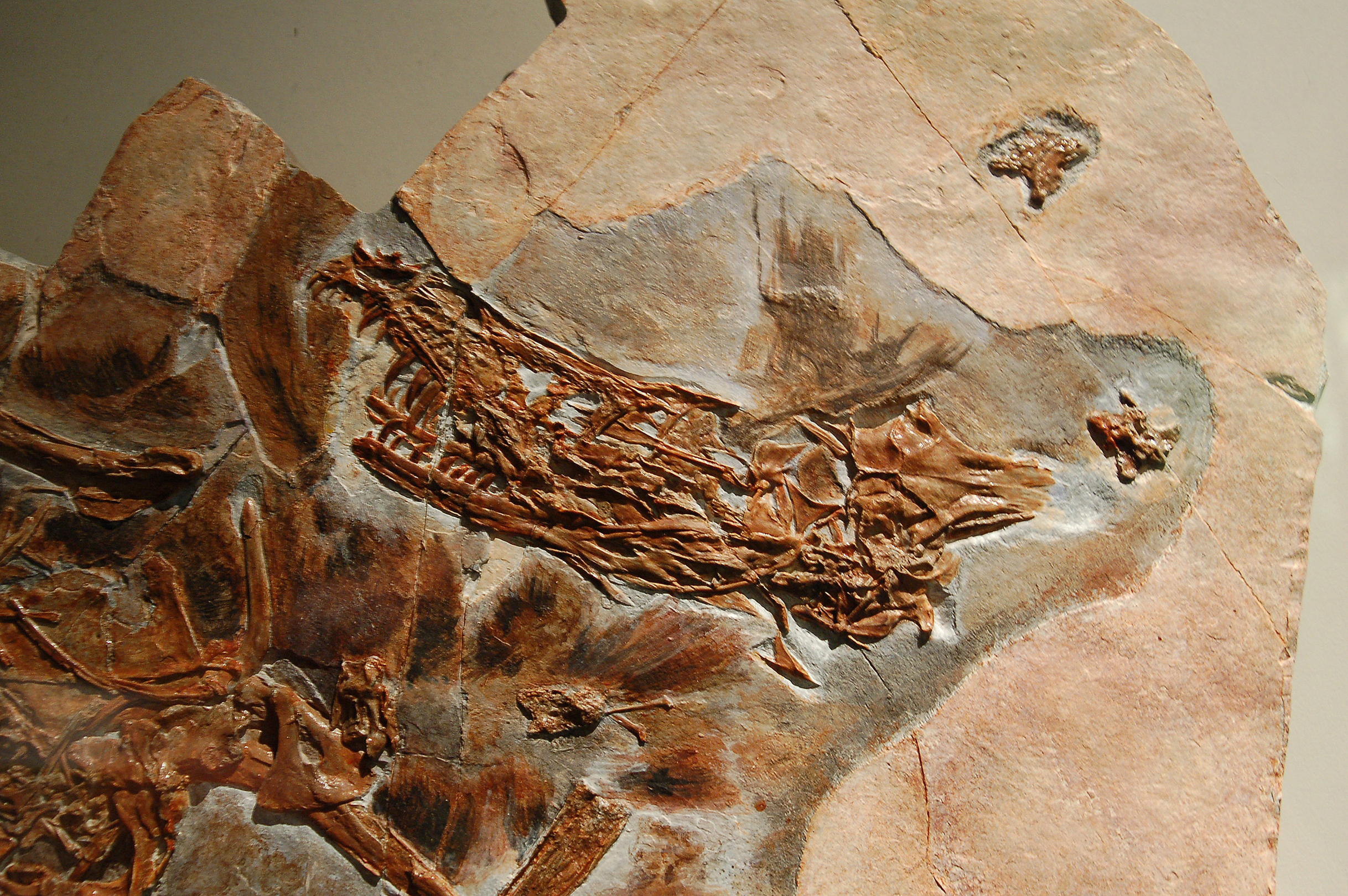
Feathers today serve the function of flight, but they were co-opted rather than adapted for this task, having evolved for an earlier purpose in theropods like Sinornithosaurus millenii, perhaps insulation.

A trait which persists in a population is often assumed by biologists to have been selected for in the course of evolution, raising the question of how the trait achieves this. Biologists call any such mechanism the function of the trait, using phrases like "A function of stotting by antelopes is to communicate to predators that they have been detected", or "The primate hand is designed (by natural selection) for grasping."

An adaptation is an observable structure or other feature of an organism (for example, an enzyme) generated by natural selection to serve its current function. A biologist might propose the hypothesis that feathers are adaptations for bird flight. That would require three things: that the trait of having feathers is heritable; that the trait does serve the function of flight; and that the trait increases the fitness of the organisms that have it. Feathers clearly meet these three conditions in living birds. However, there is also a historical question, namely, did the trait arise at the same time as bird flight? Unfortunately for the hypothesis, this seems not to be so: theropod dinosaurs had feathers, but many of them did not fly. Feathers can be described as an exaptation, having been co-opted for flight but having evolved earlier for another purpose such as insulation. Biologists may describe both the co-option and the earlier adaptation in teleological language.

== Status in evolutionary biology ==
=== A problematic issue ===
Apparent teleology is a recurring issue in evolutionary biology, much to the consternation of some writers, and as an explanatory style it remains controversial. There are various reasons why biologists may find teleology problematic.

Firstly, the concept of adaptation is itself controversial, as it can be taken to imply, as the evolutionary biologists Stephen J. Gould and Richard Lewontin argued, that biologists agree with Voltaire's Doctor Pangloss in his 1759 satire Candide that this is "the best of all possible worlds", in other words that every trait is perfectly suited to its functions. However, all that evolutionary biology requires is the weaker claim that one trait is at least slightly better in a certain context than another, and hence is selected for.

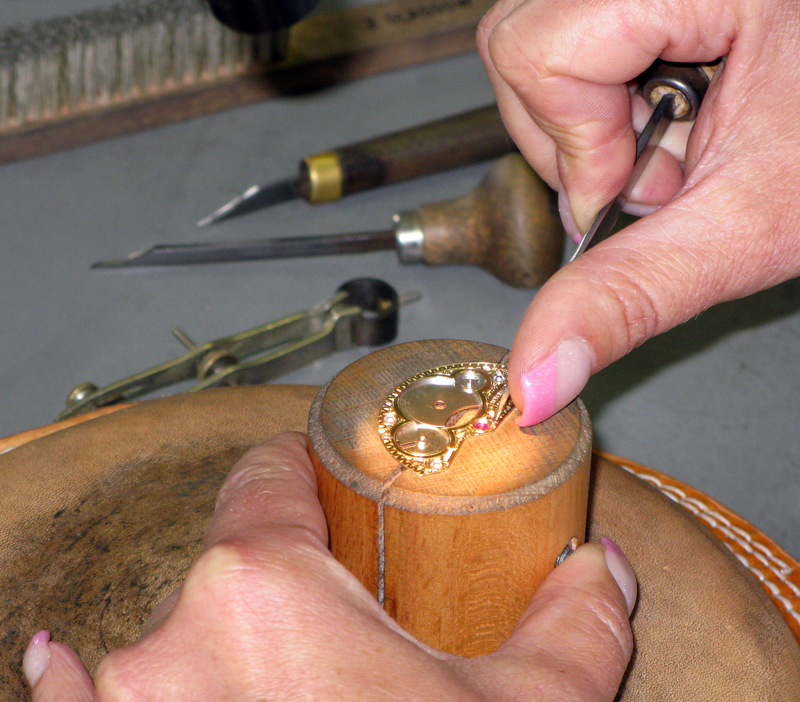
The watchmaker analogy argues that the presence of a complex mechanism like a watch implies the existence of a conscious designer.

Secondly, teleology is linked to the pre-Darwinian idea of natural theology, that the natural world gives evidence of the conscious design and beneficent intentions of a creator, as in the writings of John Ray. William Derham continued Ray's tradition with books such as his 1713 Physico-Theology and his 1714 Astro-Theology. They in turn influenced William Paley who wrote a detailed teleological argument for God in 1802, Natural Theology, or Evidences of the Existence and Attributes of the Deity collected from the Appearances of Nature, starting with the watchmaker analogy. Such creationism, along with a vitalist life-force and directed orthogenetic evolution, has been rejected by most biologists.

Thirdly, attributing purposes to adaptations risks confusion with popular forms of Lamarckism where animals in particular have been supposed to influence their own evolution through their intentions, though Lamarck himself spoke rather of habits of use, and the belief that his thinking was teleological has been challenged.

Fourthly, the teleological explanation of adaptation is uncomfortable because it seems to require backward causation, in which existing traits are explained by future outcomes; because it seems to attribute the action of a conscious mind when none is assumed to be present in an organism; and because, as a result, adaptation looks impossible to test empirically.

A fifth reason concerns students rather than researchers: Gonzalez Galli argues that since people naturally imagine that evolution has a purpose or direction, then the use of teleological language by scientists may act as an obstacle to students when learning about natural selection. Such language, he argues, should be removed to make teaching more effective.

=== Removable teleological shorthand ===
Illustration of teleology in biology, relating an observed physiological mechanism to an inferred evolved function and an assumed selective advantage. Philosophers of science have debated whether the teleological language is just a removable shorthand or an essential part of the argument.

Statements which imply that nature has goals, for example where a species is said to do something "in order to" achieve survival, appear teleological, and therefore invalid to evolutionary biologists. It is however usually possible to rewrite such sentences to avoid the apparent teleology. Some biology courses have incorporated exercises requiring students to rephrase such sentences so that they do not read teleologically. Nevertheless, biologists still frequently write in a way which can be read as implying teleology, even though that is not their intention. John Reiss argues that evolutionary biology can be purged of apparent teleology by rejecting the pre-Darwinian watchmaker analogy for natural selection; other arguments against this analogy have also been promoted by writers such as the evolutionary biologist Richard Dawkins.

Some philosophers of biology such as James G. Lennox have argued that Darwin was a teleologist, while others like Michael Ghiselin described this claim as a myth promoted by misinterpretations of his discussions, and emphasized the distinction between using teleological metaphors and actually being teleological. Michael Heads, on the other hand, describes a change in Darwin's thinking about evolution that can be traced from the first volume of On the Origin of Species to later volumes. For Heads, Darwin was originally a far more teleological thinker, but over time, "learned to avoid teleology." Heads cites a letter Darwin wrote in 1872, in which he downplayed the role of natural selection as a causal force on its own in explaining biological adaptation, and instead gave more weight to "laws of growth," that operate [without the aid of natural selection].

Andrew Askland from the Sandra Day O'Connor College of Law claims that unlike transhumanism, an ideology that aims to improve the human condition, which he asserts is "wholly teleological", Darwinian evolution is not teleological.

Various commentators view the teleological phrases used in modern evolutionary biology as a type of shorthand for describing any function which offers an evolutionary advantage through natural selection. For example, the zoologist S. H. P. Madrell wrote that "the proper but cumbersome way of describing change by evolutionary adaptation [may be] substituted by shorter overtly teleological statements" for the sake of saving space, but that this "should not be taken to imply that evolution proceeds by anything other than from mutations arising by chance, with those that impart an advantage being retained by natural selection."

=== Irreducible teleology ===
Other philosophers of biology argue instead that biological teleology is irreducible, and cannot be removed by any simple process of rewording. Francisco Ayala specified three separate situations in which teleological explanations are appropriate. First, if the agent consciously anticipates the goal of their own action; for example the behavior of picking up a pen can be explained by reference to the agent's desire to write. Ayala extends this type of teleological explanation to non-human animals by noting that "A deer running away from a mountain lion ... has at least the appearance of purposeful behavior." Second, teleological explanations are useful for systems that have a mechanism for self-regulation despite fluctuations in environment; for example, the self-regulation of body temperature in animals. Finally, they are appropriate "in reference to structures anatomically and physiologically designed to perform a certain function."

Ayala, relying on work done by the philosopher Ernest Nagel, also rejects the idea that teleological arguments are inadmissible because they cannot be causal. For Nagel, teleological arguments must be consistent because they can always be reformulated as non-teleological arguments. The difference between the two is, for Ayala, merely one of emphasis. Nagel writes that while teleological arguments focus on "the consequences for a given system of a constituent part or process," the equivalent non-teleological arguments focus on ""some of the conditions ... under which the system persists in its characteristic organization and activities." However, Francisco Ayala argued that teleological statements are more explanatory and cannot be disposed of. Karen Neander similarly argued that the modern concept of biological 'function' depends on natural selection. So, for example, it is not possible to say that anything that simply winks into existence, without going through a process of selection, actually has functions. We decide whether an appendage has a function by analysing the process of selection that led to it. Therefore, Neander argues, any talk of functions must be posterior to natural selection, function must be defined by reference to the history of a species, and teleology cannot be avoided. The evolutionary biologist Ernst Mayr likewise stated that "adaptedness ... is an a posteriori result rather than an a priori goal-seeking."

Angela Breitenbach, from a Kantian perspective, argues in Kant Yearbook that teleology in biology is important as "a heuristic in the search for causal explanations of nature and ... an inevitable analogical perspective on living beings." In her view of Kant, teleology implies something that cannot be explained by science, but only understood through analogy.

Colin Pittendrigh coined the similar term 'teleonomy' for apparently goal-directed biological phenomena. For Pittendrigh, the notion of 'adaptation' in biology, however it is defined, necessarily "connote that aura of design, purpose, or end-directedness, which has, since the time of Aristotle, seemed to characterize the living thing." This association with Aristotle, however, is problematic, because it meant that the study of adaptation would inevitably be bound up with teleological explanations. Pittendrigh sought to preserve the aspect of design and purpose in biological systems, while denying that this design can be understood as a causal principle. The confusion, he says, would be removed if we described these systems "by some other term, like 'teleonomic,' in order to emphasize that the recognition and description of end-directedness does not carry a commitment to Aristotelian teleology as an efficient causal principle." Ernst Mayr criticised Pittendrigh's confusion of Aristotle's four causes, arguing that evolution only involved the material and formal but not the efficient cause. (Note: Both Pittendrigh and Mayr endorsed teleology in biology as an inherent part of evolutionary thinking.) Mayr proposed to use the term only for "systems operating on the basis of a program of coded information."

William C. Wimsatt affirmed that the teleologicality of the language of biology and other fields derives from the logical structure of their background theories, and not merely from the use of teleological locutions such as "function" and "in order to". He stated that "To replace talk about function by talk about selection ... is not to eliminate teleology but to rephrase it". However, Wimsatt argues that this thought does not mean an appeal to backwards causation, vitalism, entelechy, or anti-reductionist sentiments.

The biologist J. B. S. Haldane observed that "Teleology is like a mistress to a biologist: he cannot live without her but he's unwilling to be seen with her in public."

== See also ==
- Fitness landscape – Model used to visualise relationship between genotypes and reproductive success
- Teleomechanism – Principle that mechanism is compatible with teleology
