= Jules Pizzetta =

French naturalist and author

Jules Pizzetta (1820–1900) was the pseudonym of a French naturalist and author, J. P. Houzé.

== Publications ==
=== Science ===
- Quinze jours au bord de la mer: flâneries d'un naturaliste (1845), Paris: Dupray de la Mahérie
- Encyclopédie nationale des sciences, des lettres et des arts, 4 vols. (1851, with Louis Barré), Paris: J. Bry
  - Online: vol. 1; vol. 2; vol. 3; vol. 4.
- Dictionnaire populaire d'histoire naturelle et des phénomènes de la nature (1857), J. Martinon
  - Dictionnaire populaire illustré d'histoire naturelle (1890), introduction by Edmond Perrier, A. Hennuyer, XL+1164 p.—2nd ed. (1905)
- La botanique des écoles, petit traité de physique végétale (1862), P. Dupont
- Les secrets de la plage (1869), Paris: P. Brunet
- Le monde avant le Déluge (1869), Paris: P. Brunet—Digitizations: Google Books; archive.org
  - El mundo antes del diluvio (1888) (in Spanish)
- Histoire d'une feuille de papier (1870), Paris: P. Brunet—Digitizations: Gallica; Google Books
  - Storia d'un foglio di carta (1873) (in Italian)
  - Historia de un pliego de papel (1887) (in Spanish)
- L'aquarium d'eau douce—d'eau de mer (1872), J. Rothschild
- Les voyages d'une goutte d'eau (1872), A. Rigaud
- Le monde polaire (1877), A. Rigaud
- Le trésor de la famille, encyclopédie des connaissances utiles dans la vie pratique (1877), J. Rothschild
- La pisciculture fluviale et maritime en France: culture de l'écrevisse et des sangsues (1880) (in the same volume as L'ostréiculture et la pêche côtière en France by Ferdinand François De Bon), Paris: J. Rothschild
- Les veillées de Jean Rustique, simples entretiens sur les animaux utiles et les animaux nuisibles (1880), P. Dupont
- Le livre des métiers manuels[…] (1882), G. Samson
- Le feu et l'eau (1884), Paris: A. Hennuyer
- Petit manuel de photographie pratique à l'usage des gens du monde (1891), Paris: A. Hennuyer
- Galerie des naturalistes: histoire des sciences naturelles, Paris: A. Hennuyer (1894)—Digitizations: archive.org; Google Books
- Les loisirs d'un campagnard—Digitizations of the 2nd ed.: archive.org; biodiversitylibrary.org
- Plantes et bêtes, causeries familières sur l'histoire naturelle (1894), Paris: A. Hennuyer
- Boulogne et Calais: la baie de Somme: les étapes d'un touriste en France (1897)
  - Reprint: Le Livre d'histoire (2001)
  - Excerpt: Promenades en baie de Somme (2005), la Découvrance éd. ISBN 2-84265-369-6

=== Libretto ===
- Pauvre Venise!, lyrics by Jules Pizzetta, music by Melle Émilie Pizzetta
