= Peter J. Bowler =

Irish historian of biology (1944-)

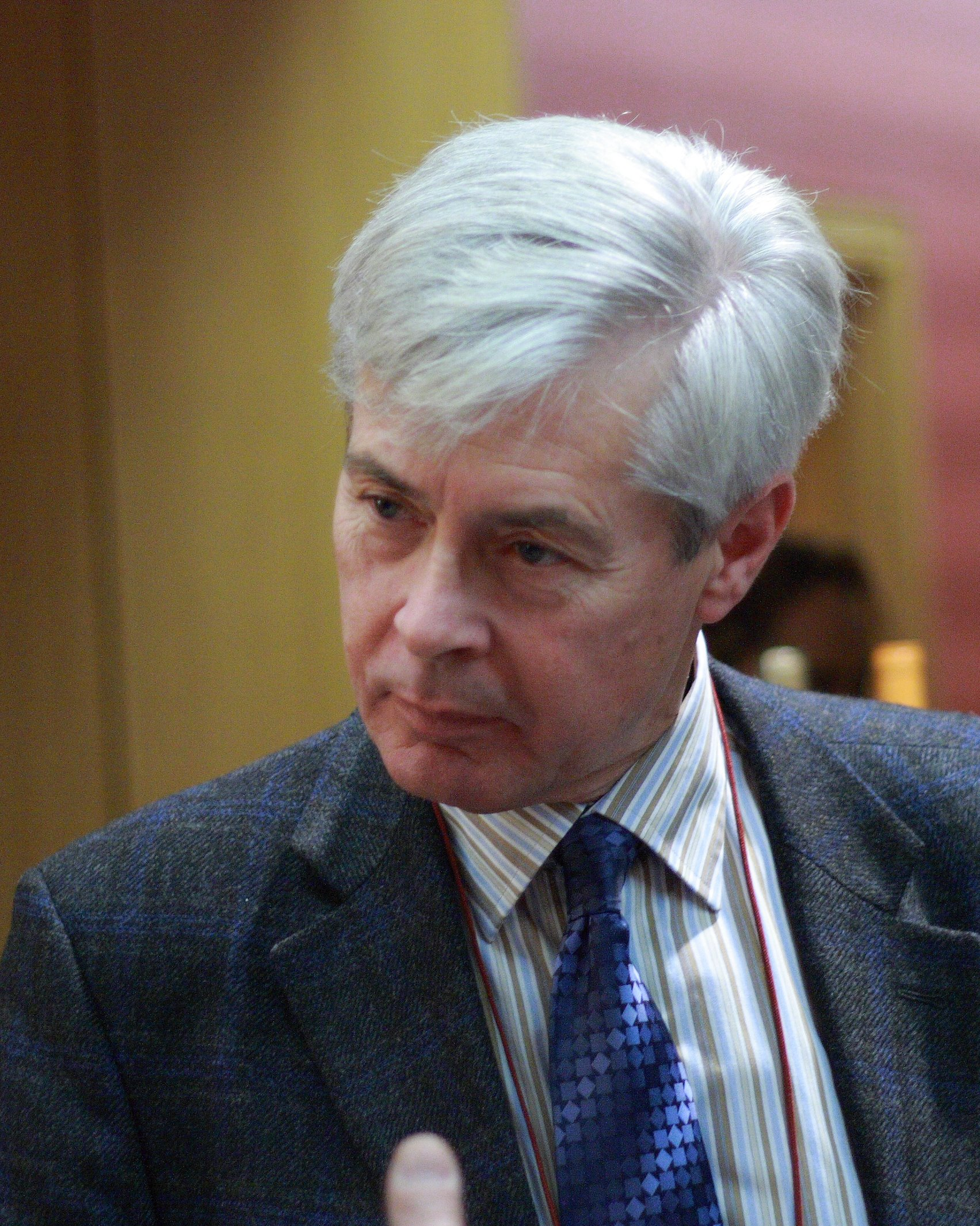
Peter J. Bowler at the 2007 History of Science Society meeting

Peter John Bowler FBA (born 8 October 1944) is a historian of biology who has written extensively on the history of evolutionary thought, the history of the environmental sciences, and on the history of genetics. His 1984 book, Evolution: The History of an Idea is a standard textbook on the history of evolution; a 25th anniversary edition came in 2009. His 1983 book The Eclipse of Darwinism: Anti-Darwinian Evolution Theories in the Decades Around 1900 describes (in a phrase of Julian Huxley's) the scientific predominance of other evolutionary theories which led many to minimise the significance of natural selection, in the first part of the twentieth century before genetics was reconciled with natural selection in the modern synthesis.

== Life ==
Peter Bowler attended Alderman Newton's School in Leicester before going up to King's College, Cambridge, where he read natural sciences (history and philosophy of science). He holds a BA from the University of Cambridge, an MSc from the University of Sussex and a PhD from the University of Toronto. In the 1970s he taught at the School of Humanities, Universiti Sains Malaysia, Penang. He is currently a professor in the history of science at Queen's University Belfast, and is an elected Fellow of the American Association for the Advancement of Science and a corresponding member of the Académie Internationale d'Histoire des Sciences. He was President of the British Society for the History of Science from 2004 to 2006.

His current interests are in the development and implications of Darwinism, the history of the environmental sciences, science and religion (especially twentieth century), and popular science writing. Current research is on the production of popular science literature in early twentieth-century Britain, with particular emphasis on the role played by professional scientists. Bowler discusses the attempts by Victorian scientists to promote science for public understanding and the increasing accessibility of popular science works.

Bowler has criticised creationism in Northern Ireland. He has made appearances on local radio, including interviews with William Crawley on BBC Radio Ulster shows TalkBack and Sunday Sequence - here he defended evolution and highlighted the non-scientific nature of creationism.

== Publications ==
- Fossils and Progress: Palaeontology and the Idea of Progressive Evolution in the Nineteenth Century (1976) ISBN 0882020439
- Theories of Human Evolution: A Century of Debate, 1844–1944 (Wiley-Blackwell 1987)
- The Mendelian Revolution: The Emergence of Hereditarian Concepts in Modern Science and Society (Continuum International, Athlone, 1989)
- The Invention of Progress: Victorians and the Past (Wiley-Blackwell, 1989)
- The Non-Darwinian Revolution: Reinterpreting a Historical Myth (Johns Hopkins University Press, New Edition, 1988)
- The Eclipse of Darwinism: Anti-Darwinian Evolution Theories in the Decades Around 1900 (Johns Hopkins University Press, 1983)
- The Fontana History of the Environmental Sciences (Fontana Press, 1992)
- Biology and Social Thought: 1850–1914 : Five Lectures Delivered at the International Summer School in History of Science Uppsala, July 1990 (Univ of California, 1993)
- Charles Darwin: the man and his influence (Cambridge, 1996).
- Life's splendid drama: evolutionary biology and the reconstruction of life’s ancestry, 1860–1940 (Chicago, 1996).
- Reconciling science and religion: the debate in early twentieth-century Britain (Chicago, 2001).
- "The spectre of Darwinism: popular images of Darwinism in early twentieth-century Britain" in Abigail Lustig, Robert J. Richards and Michael Ruse (eds), Darwinian Heresies (Cambridge, 2004) ISBN 9780521815161.
- (With I.R. Morus) Making modern science: a historical survey (Chicago, 2005).
- 'Experts and publishers: writing popular science in early twentieth-century Britain' in British Journal for the History of Science, xxxix (2006).
- Monkey Trials and Gorilla Sermons; Evolution and Christianity from Darwin to Intelligent Design (Harvard University Press, 2007) ISBN 9780674032200.
- 'Darwin's Originality', in Science (9 January 2009: Vol. 323. no. 5911, pp. 223 – 226) doi:10.1126/science.1160332
- Evolution: the history of an idea (4th ed., California, 2009, ISBN 0520261283).
- Science for All: The Popularization of Science in Early Twentieth-Century Britain (Chicago, 2009).
- Q&A Darwin: Off the Record (with foreword by Richard Dawkins) (Duncan Baird, 2010).
- Darwin Deleted: Imagining a World Without Darwin (University of Chicago Press, 2013). ISBN 0226068676
- A History of the Future: Prophets of Progress from H. G. Wells to Asimov (Cambridge University Press, 2017) ISBN 978-1316602621
