= Michael Ghiselin =

American biologist and philosopher (1939–2024)

Michael T. Ghiselin (born May 13, 1939; died June 14, 2024) was an American biologist and philosopher as well as a historian of biology, formerly at the California Academy of Sciences.

He is known for his work concerning sea slugs, and for his criticism of the falsification of the history of Lamarckism in biology textbooks.

== Academic life ==
Ghiselin received his B.A. in 1960 from the University of Utah and his Ph.D. from Stanford University in 1965. He became a Postdoctoral Fellow at Harvard University (1964–65) and later became Postdoctoral Fellow at the Marine Biological Laboratory in 1965. There he stayed until 1967 as he was appointed assistant professor of zoology at the University of California, Berkeley and later was chosen as a Guggenheim Fellow (1978–79). Ghiselin served as research professor of biology at the University of Utah (1980–83) and was MacArthur Prize Fellow from 1981 to 1986. From 1983 he was a senior research fellow at the California Academy of Sciences.

== Career ==
Ghiselin is famous for his work on sea slugs, and had both a species (Hypselodoris ghiselini) and the defensive chemical that it contains (ghiselinin) named after him. In 2009 he co-authored a major study on chemical defense with Guido Cimino: Chemical Defense and the Evolution of Opisthobranch Gastropods.

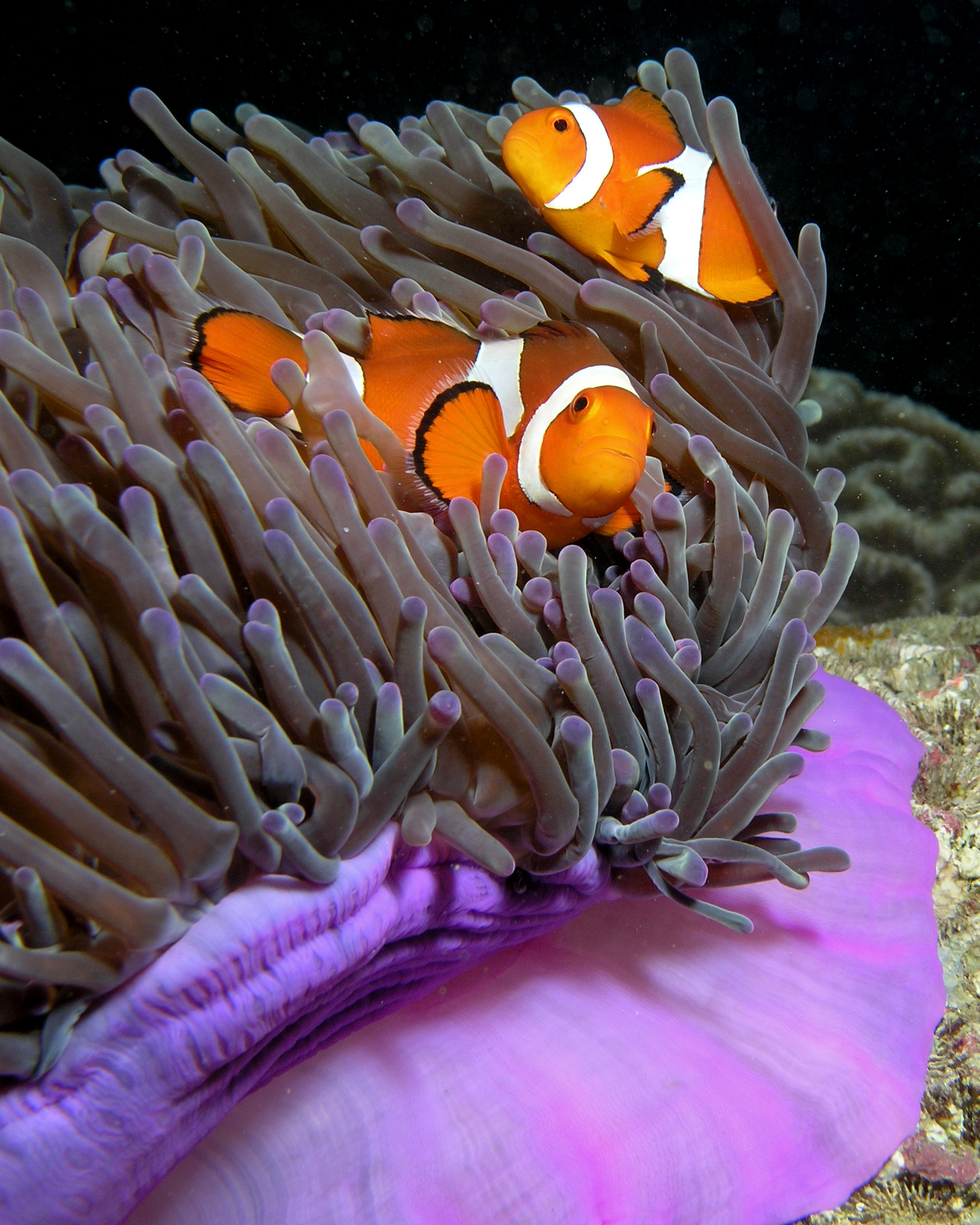
Clownfish is male when small, female when larger, an adaptation explained by Ghiselin's size-advantage model.

In 1969 he proposed three models including the size-advantage model to explain sequential hermaphroditism. In some fish species, he reasoned, males can maximize their reproductive success by breeding with a harem of females rather than breeding only once as a female. In other species, where the fish live in pairs, it is to an individual's advantage to be male when small and to turn into a female when it is larger.

Ghiselin worked on the history and philosophy of evolutionary biology. His historical publications dealt mainly with Darwin and the history of comparative zoology. They include such topics as the influence of alchemy on nineteenth century zoology and the history of the Zoological Station at Naples, Italy. His thought on Darwin's view of selection, whether to the individual or to the group, and sometimes apparently kin selectionist, has been criticised as inconsistent by the Darwinian philosopher Helena Cronin.

His main contribution to the philosophy of biology concerns the principles of biological classification. Ghiselin is widely credited with providing the first explicit philosophical formulation of the species-as-individuals (SAI) thesis, initially proposed in 1966 and further elaborated in later works. According to this view, biological species are not merely logical classes or natural kinds, but concrete historical entities with spatiotemporal continuity.

Although related ideas can be traced back to earlier evolutionary thinkers, such as Haeckel’s historical conception of species and Hennig’s phylogenetic approach, Ghiselin’s contribution was to articulate these insights within a systematic philosophical framework and to establish the species-as-individuals view as a central position in debates on biological classification and philosophy of science.

He criticised the falsification of the history of Lamarck's theory of evolution, where in his view schoolbooks and "textbook-writers have imbued the fictitious Lamarck with an importance that the real Lamarck never had, and they have credited him with ideas that the real Lamarck did not hold. They have invented a myth in which those ideas are compared falsely with Darwin's ideas, to produce a bogus dichotomy." He has also criticized the views of creationists as non-scientific.

His main contribution to philosophy concerns the principles of classification (systematics or taxonomy). He is given much of the credit for first theorizing that biological species are not kinds of organisms, but are rather individuals in a philosophical sense (in the manner that an individual population is an individual entity, rather than an abstract type). A human being is not a Homo sapiens for the same reason that Ontario is not a Canada. Ghiselin was the originator of the term "chunks of the genealogical nexus" to describe species.

Ghiselin had many interdisciplinary interests, among which was forging links between biology and economics. He was Vice President of the International Society for Bioeconomics, and served as the Co-Editor of the Journal of Bioeconomics since it was established in 1998. The first academic chair of bioeconomics was established at the University of Siena; as a visiting professor he was its first occupant. As Chair of the Center for the History and Philosophy of Science his main responsibility was to organize scholarly meetings and to serve as Editor of the volumes based on them.

He was made a Guggenheim fellow in 1978.

== Works ==
- Ghiselin, Michael T. and Leviton, Alan E.: "Darwin and the Galapagos", in Proceedings of the California Academy of Sciences 2010, Volume 61, Supplement 2.
- The Triumph of the Darwinian Method. University of California Press, Berkeley, 1969.
- Barbour, M. G., Craig, R. B., Drysdale, F. R., and Ghiselin, M. T.: Coastal Ecology: Bodega Head. University of California Press, Berkeley, 1973.
- The Economy of Nature and the Evolution of Sex. University of California Press, Berkeley, 1974.
- Intellectual Compromise: The Bottom Line. Paragon House, New York, 1989.
- Metaphysics and the Origin of Species. State University of New York Press, Albany, 1997.
- Darwin: A Reader's Guide. Occasional Papers of the California Academy of Sciences 155: 1–185, 2009.
- Darwin and Evolution. Carmichael & Carmichael, and Knowledge Products Blackstone Audio, 1993 (audiobook).
