= Richard Levins =

American Marxist biologist (1930–2016)

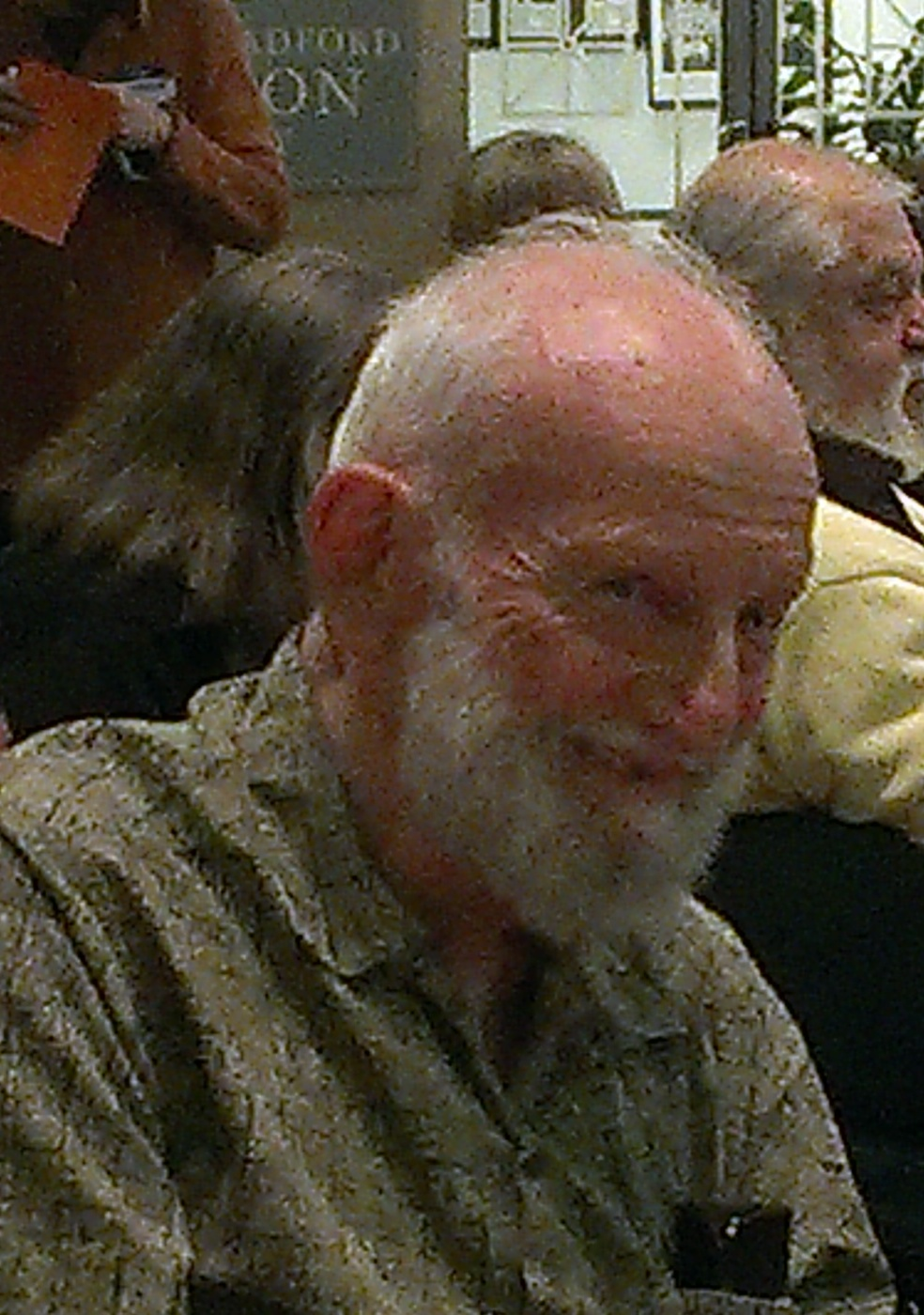
- Levins in 2015
- Born: June 1, 1930; Brooklyn, New York, U.S.
- Died: January 19, 2016 (aged 85); Cambridge, Massachusetts, U.S. Ethnicity Ukrainian Jewish heritage
- Education: Cornell University (agriculture and mathematics), Columbia University
- Known for: mathematical ecology, political activism, population genetics, evolution in changing environments, farming in Cuba, and metapopulations (a Marxist theory of biology) Societies US National Academy of Sciences (resigned), Cuban Academy of Sciences, Robert Wood Johnson Foundation * American Public Health Association
- Spouse(s): Rosario Morales (1950), died 2011; 3 children: Aurora Levins Morales, born February 24, 1954, Indiera Baja, Maricao, Puerto Rico, Ricardo Levins Morales, Alejandro 'Jandro' Levins
- Scientific career
- Fields: mathematical ecology, evolutionary biology, scientific modelling, loop analysis, complexity, philosophy of science, “looking at the whole”
- Workplaces: University of Puerto Rico (1961 to 1967), University of Havana, New York University, University of Chicago, Harvard University, Harvard School of Public Health
- Thesis: Theory of fitness in a heterogeneous environment, published by Essex Institute, New York, 1965 (1965)

External image
- Dr. Richard Levins, teaching

Richard Levins (June 1, 1930 – January 19, 2016) was a Marxist biologist, population geneticist, biomathematician, mathematical ecologist, zoologist and philosopher of science who researched diversity in human populations. Until his death, he was a university professor at the Harvard T.H. Chan School of Public Health and a long-time political activist. He was best known for his work on evolution and complexity in changing environments and on metapopulations.

In addition to his scientific work, Levins wrote extensively on philosophical issues in biology and modelling. One of his most cited articles is "The Strategy of Model Building in Population Biology" (1966). He influenced a number of philosophers of science through his writings.

Levins often boasted that he was a "fourth generation Marxist" and said that his methodology in Evolution in Changing Environments was based on Marx's Grundrisse, the notes (not published till 1939) for Das Kapital. With evolutionary geneticist Richard Lewontin, Levins authored numerous articles on the social implications of biology, many of which were collected in The Dialectical Biologist (1985). In 2007, the duo published a second anthology titled Biology Under the Influence: Dialectical Essays on Ecology, Agriculture, and Health. Levins and Lewontin also co-wrote satirical articles criticizing sociobiology, systems modeling in ecology, and other topics under the pseudonym Isadore Nabi.

== Biography ==
Richard Levins was of Ukrainian Jewish heritage and was born on June 1, 1930, in Brooklyn, New York. He recorded reminiscences of his politically and scientifically precocious childhood in an autobiographical essay in Red Diapers. He claimed to have read Paul de Kruif's Microbe Hunters (1926) at age eight and the first of Charles Darwin's books at age twelve. He said he was inspired at age ten by the essays of the Marxist biological polymath J. B. S. Haldane, whom Levins considered to be the equal of Albert Einstein in scientific importance.

Levins studied agriculture and mathematics at Cornell. He married Puerto Rican writer Rosario Morales in 1950. Blacklisted on his graduation from Cornell, he and Rosario moved to Puerto Rico, where they farmed and did rural organizing. They returned to New York in 1956, where he earned his PhD at Columbia University (awarded 1965). Levins taught at the University of Puerto Rico from 1961 to 1967 and was a prominent member of the Puerto Rican independence movement. He visited Cuba for the first time in 1964, beginning a lifelong scientific and political collaboration with Cuban biologists. His active participation in the independence and anti-war movements in Puerto Rico led to his being denied tenure at the University of Puerto Rico, and in 1967 he and Rosario and their three children - Aurora, Ricardo, and Alejandro - moved to Chicago, where he taught at the University of Chicago and interacted frequently with Lewontin. Richard and Rosario later moved to Harvard with the sponsorship of E. O. Wilson, with whom they had later disputes over sociobiology. Levins was elected to the US National Academy of Sciences but resigned because of the Academy's role in advising the US military during the Vietnam War. He had been a member of the US and Puerto Rican Communist Parties, the Movimiento Pro Independencia (the Independence movement in Puerto Rico), and the Puerto Rican Socialist Party, and he was on an FBI surveillance list.

Until his death, Levins was John Rock Professor of Population Sciences and head of the Human Ecology program in the Department of Global Health and Population of the Harvard School of Public Health (HSPH). In the early 1990s, Levins and others formed the Harvard Working Group on New and Resurgent Diseases. Their work showed that alarming new infections had sprung from changes in the environment, either natural or caused by humans (Wilson et al. 1994).

During his final two decades, Levins concentrated on applying ecology to agriculture, particularly in the economically less-well-developed nations. As a member of the OXFAM-America Board of Directors and former chair of their subcommittee on Latin America and the Caribbean, he "worked from a critique of the industrial-commercial pathway of development, he promoted alternative development pathways that emphasized economic viability with equity, ecological and social sustainability, and empowerment of the dispossessed."

When his wife Rosario died in 2011, Levins' daughter Aurora moved in with him in his Cambridge, Massachusetts home.

One of Levins' grandchildren is Minneapolis-based hip hop artist Manny Phesto.

Levins died in Cambridge, Massachusetts, on January 19, 2016.

A species of lizard, Sphaerodactylus levinsi, is named in his honor.

== Evolution in changing environments ==
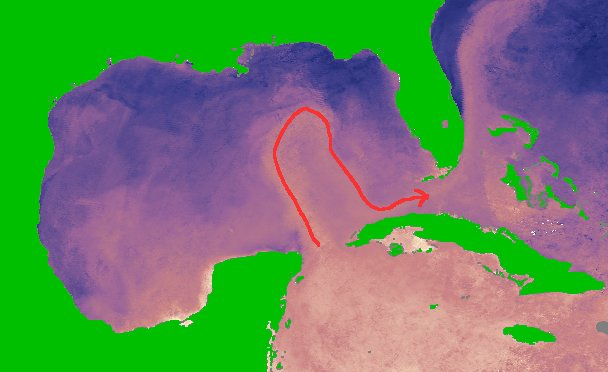
A Map of the Loop Current (refers to the oceanic phenomenon. For the electrical signaling schemes, see current loop. For the network analysis variable, see loop current).

Prior to Levins' work, population genetics had assumed the environment to be constant, while mathematical ecology assumed the genetic makeup of the species involved to be constant. Levins modelled the situation in which evolution is taking place while the environment changes. One of the surprising consequences of his model is that selection need not maximize adaptation, and that species can select themselves to extinction. He encapsulated his major early results in Evolution in Changing Environments, a book based on lectures he delivered in Cuba in the early 1960s.

Levins made extensive use of mathematics, some of which he invented himself, although it had been previously developed in other areas of pure mathematics or economics without his awareness of it. For instance, Levins utilized convex set theory for fitness sets, (resembling the economic formulations of J. R. Hicks) and extended Sewall Wright's path analysis to the analysis of causal feedback loops. John Vandermeer writes that Levins' mathematical technique of loop analysis showed "how variables effectively act to loop back on themselves (a predator that overeats a prey, for example, creates a negative loop on itself by reducing its own key resources)", and that this technique "could be applied in all sorts of ecological situations, effectively creating a new mode of analysis of ecological systems."

Levins' work on evolution in changing environments was partly driven by his desire to expand the Marxist dialectic and dialectical materialism into "a dialectical naturalism that encompassed the ecological connections/contradictions of humanity and the earth". As he later put it, he "loved asymmetry and complexity, threshold effects, contradiction":

Dialectical thinking, with its emphasis on complexity, context, change, discontinuity, interpenetration, and contradictions, was and has remained a thing of beauty for me and the guiding theme in my scientific research.

== Metapopulation theory ==

The term metapopulation was coined by Levins in 1969 to describe a "population of populations". Populations inhabit a landscape of suitable habitat patches, each capable of hosting a local sub-population. Local populations may become extinct and be subsequently recolonized by immigration from patches; the fate of such a system of local populations (i.e., the metapopulation) depends on the balance between extinctions and colonizations. Levins introduced a model consisting of a single differential equation, nowadays known as the Levins model, to describe the dynamics of average patch occupancy in such systems. Metapopulation theory has since become an important area of spatial ecology, with applications in conservation biology, population management, and pest control.

== Quotations ==
- "The world is stranger than we can imagine and surprises are inevitable in science. Thus we found, for example, that pesticides increase pests, antibiotics can create pathogens, agricultural development creates hunger, and flood control leads to flooding. But some of these surprises could have been avoided if the problems had been posed big enough to accommodate solutions in the context of the whole." – Dr. Richard Levins

== Awards ==
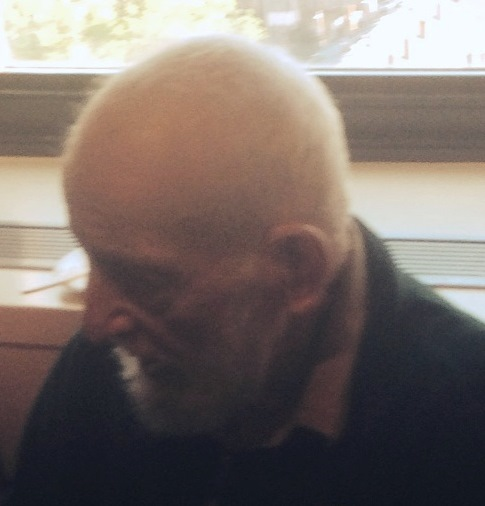
Levins at HSPH Reception for his 85th birthday, May 21, 2015

- Edinburgh Medal in Science and Society
- Lukács 21st Century Award (for his contributions to mathematical ecology)
- Numerous awards in Puerto Rico and Cuba (for contributions to ecology and agriculture; including the 30th Anniversary Medal of the Cuban Academy of Sciences)
- Robert Wood Johnson Foundation 'Investigator Awards in Health Policy Research', 1995
- Honorary Doctorate in Environmental Science from the University of Havana, 1999
- Honorary Master of Philosophy in Human Ecology from College of the Atlantic, 2012
- American Public Health Association's 2007 Milton Terris Global Health Award: Lecture: "One Foot in, One Foot out"
- "The Truth is the Whole: A Symposium in Celebration of the Unity and Dynamic Complexity of Life" was a Festschrift in Honor of Richard Levins for his 85th birthday at Harvard T.H. Chan School of Public Health, May 21–23, 2015. Essays, tributes, and reminiscences based on the symposium were published in 2018.

== Selected bibliography ==
- Levins, R. "Genetic Consequences of Natural Selection," in Talbot Waterman and Harold Morowitz, eds., Theoretical and Mathematical Biology, Yale, 1965, pp. 372–387.
- Levins, R (1966). "The Strategy of Model Building in Population Biology". American Scientist. 54: 421–431.
- Levins, R. Evolution in Changing Environments, Princeton University Press, 1968.
- Levins, R. "Some demographic and genetic consequences of environmental heterogeneity for biological control", Bulletin of the Entomological Society of America, 15:237–240, 1969.
- Levins, R. "Extinction", in M. Gerstenhaver, Editor. Some Mathematical Problems in Biology. American Mathematical Society, Providence, RI, Pages 77–104. In this historic paper, Levins coined the term 'metapopulation' (now widely used).
- Levins, R. "Evolution in communities near equilibrium", in M. L. Cody and J.M. Diamond (eds) Ecology and Evolution of Communities, Harvard University Press, 1975.
- Nabi, I., (pseud.) "An Evolutionary Interpretation of the English Sonnet: First Annual Piltdown Man Lecture on Man and Society," Science and Nature, no. 3, 1980, 71-73.
- Levinsin, R., Haila, Y. Marxilaisena biologinen Yhdysvalloissa. Richard Levinsin haastattelu [Yrjö Haila]. Tiede & edistys 8(1):29-37 (1983).
- Levins, R. and R.C. Lewontin, The Dialectical Biologist, Harvard University Press, 1985.
- Puccia, C.J. and Levins, R. Qualitative Modeling of Complex Systems: An Introduction to Loop Analysis and Time Averaging, Harvard University Press, Cambridge, MA. 1986.
- Levins, R. and Vandermeer, J. "The agroecosystem embedded in a complex ecological community" in: Carroll R.C., Vandermeer J. and Rosset P., eds., Agroecology, New York: Wiley and Sons, 1990.
- Haila, Y., and Levins, R. Humanity and Nature, London: Pluto Press, 1992.
- Grove, E.A.; Kocic, V.L.; Ladas, G.; Levins, R. (1993). "Periodicity in a simple genotype selection model". Diff Eq and Dynamical Systems. 1 (1): 35–50.
- Awerbuch T.E. Evolution of mathematical models of epidemics. In: Wilson, Levins, and Spielman (eds). Disease in Evolution. New York Academy of Sciences, New York 1994, 225-231.
- Wilson, M., Levins, R., and Spielman, A. (eds). Disease in Evolution. New York Academy of Sciences, New York 1994
- Levins, R.; Awerbuch, T.E.; Brinkman, U.Eckardt; Epstein, P.; Makhaoul, N.; Possas, C.A.; Puccia, C.; Spielman, A.; Wilson, M. (1994). "Preparing for new diseases". American Scientist. 82: 52–60.
- Levins, R (1996). "Ten propositions on science and antiscience". Social Text. 46 (46/47): 101–111. doi:10.2307/466847. JSTOR 466847. S2CID 13696213.
- Awerbuch T.E., Brinkman, U., Eckardt, I., Epstein, P., Ford, T., Levins, R., Makhaoul, N., Possas, C.A., Puccia, C., Spielman, A., and Wilson, M., Globalization, development, and the spread of disease. In: Goldsmith and Mander (eds.) The Case Against the Global Economy, Sierra Club Books, 1996, 160–170.
- Levins, R. "Touch Red", in Judy Kaplan and Linn Shapiro, eds., Red Diapers: Growing Up in the Communist Left, University of Illinois Press, 1998, pp. 257–265.
- Levins, R (1998). "Dialectics and systems theory". Science and Society. 62 (3): 373–399.
- Levins, R (1998). "The internal and external in explanatory theories". Science as Culture. 7 (4): 557–582. doi:10.1080/09505439809526525.
- Rapport, D.J., Costanza, R., Epstein, P., Gaudet, C. & Levins, R. (eds.) 1998. Ecosystem Health. Blackwell Science, Oxford, UK. 372pp.
- Levins, R.; Lopez, C. (1999). "Toward an ecosocial view of health". International Journal of Health Services. 29 (2): 261–293. doi:10.2190/wlvk-d0rr-kvbv-a1dh. PMID 10379454. S2CID 37698734.
- Awerbuch T., Kiszewski A., and Levins, R., Surprise, Nonlinearity and Complex Behavior. In– Health Impacts of Global Environmental Change: Concepts and Methods; Martens and Mcmichael (eds), 96-102, 2002
- Levins, R (2003). "Whose Scientific Method? Scientific Methods for a Complex World, New Solutions". New Solutions. 13 (3): 261–274. doi:10.2190/q4tn-q9u2-er56-3t1r. PMID 17208729. S2CID 9858874.
- Karpati, A.; Galea, S.; Awerbuch, T.; Levins, R. (2002). "Variability and vulnerability at the ecological level: Implications for understanding the social determinants of health". American Journal of Public Health. 92 (11): 1768–1772. doi:10.2105/ajph.92.11.1768. PMC 1447326. PMID 12406806.
- Awerbuch, T.E., Gonzalez, C., Hernandez, D., Sibat, R., Tapia, J.L., Levins, R., and Sandberg S., The natural control of the scale insect Lepidosaphes gloverii on Cuban citrus. Inter American Citrus Network newsletter No21/22, July 2004.
- Awerbuch, T.; Levins, R.; Predescu, M. (2005). "The Role of Seasonality in the Dynamics of Deer Tick Populations". Bulletin of Mathematical Biology. 67 (3): 467–486. doi:10.1016/j.bulm.2004.08.003. PMID 15820738. S2CID 28410132.
- Lewontin, R.C. and Levins, R., "Biology Under The Influence, Dialectical Essays on Ecology, Agriculture, and Health," New York: Monthly Review Press, 2007.
- Predescu, M.; Levins, R.; Awerbuch, T.E. (2006). "Analysis of a nonlinear system for community intervention in mosquito control". Discrete & Continuous Dynamical Systems - Series B. 6 (3): 605–622. doi:10.3934/dcdsb.2006.6.605.
- Awerbuch T., and Levins, R. Mathematical Models for Health Policy. in Mathematical Models, [Eds. Jerzy A. Filar, and Jacek B. Krawczyk], in Encyclopedia of Life Support Systems (EOLSS), Developed under the Auspices of the UNESCO, Eolss Publishers, Oxford, UK, , 2006
- Predescu, M., Sirbu, R., Levins, R., and Awerbuch T., On the Dynamics of a Deterministic and Stochastic Model for Mosquito Control. Applied Mathematics Letters, 20, 919-925, 2007.
- Awerbuch, T.E., Levins, R., The Aging Heart and the Loss of Complexity—a Difference Equation Model. Preliminary report. American Mathematical Society, (1056-39-2059), presented at AMS Convention, San Francisco, California, January 13, 2010
- Levins, R., Una pierna adentro, una pierna afuera. CopIt ArXives & EditoraC3, Mexico. SC0005ES. ISBN 978-1-938128-073, 2015
- Levins, R., Scientific Method for Today’s Market, The Mathematical Intelligencer, 37 (1), 47-47, 2015 (March 1).

== See also ==
- Alan Gross
- Aurora Levins Morales
- Cristina Possas
- Cuba
- Dialectic
- Ecological niche
- Eco-socialism
- Ecosocial theory
- Florida Current
- Florida Straits
- Gregory Bateson
- Gulf of Mexico
- Gulf Stream
- Isadore Nabi
- Looking Backward
- Loop Current
- Marxism
- Mesh analysis
- Metapopulation
- Milton Terris
- Ocean current
- Population dynamics
- Richard Lewontin
- Tamara Awerbuch-Friedlander
- Theses on Feuerbach
- Yucatán Peninsula
