= Isadore Nabi =

Pseudonym of scientists

Isadore Nabi (sometimes Isidore Nabi or Isador Nabi) was a pseudonym used by a group of scientists including Richard Lewontin, Richard Levins, Robert MacArthur, and Leigh van Valen in the 1960s. Inspired by the work of Nicolas Bourbaki, they allegedly hoped to create a unified approach to evolutionary biology. However, the project was aborted and the name was reused in the 1980s for satirical purposes.

Nabi's biography was listed in American Men and Women of Science, articles and letters were published in prominent journals under his name, and he was listed on the editorial board of Evolutionary Theory.

He has primarily written on sociobiology. His article, "An Evolutionary Interpretation of the English Sonnet" was delivered as the First Annual Piltdown Lecture on Man and Nature and appeared under the heading "Advances in Sociobiopsy". (The author was noted as a "Satirical Commentator".) He has also written articles critical of the systems-theoretical approach to mathematical ecology, as illustrated by what our laws of motion in physics would look like if early physicists had used the methods of the systems ecologists (this time listing the author as "Intrepid Investigator"). In 2002 he published a piece (under the name "Isador Nabi") on stock tips in Gene Watch. It was identified as humor.

== Biography ==
His biography in American Men and Women of Science reads:

NABI, ISIDORE, b Brno, Czech, July 22, 10; m 30; c 6. POPULATION BIOLOGY. Educ: Cochabamba Univ, AB, 30; Nat Univ Mex, MD. 36. Hon Degrees: PhD, Cochabamba Univ, 50; LLB. Nat Univ Mex, 39. Prof Exp: Petrol geologist. Ministeno de Fomento, Venezuela, 40-42; instr biol. Hunter Col, 45-47; resident path, Kings County Hosp. Brooklyn, 47-49; ed & publisher, Boletin de Medicina Forensics, Caracas, 49-51; lectr & res assoc path, Univ Venezuela, 51-56; Guggenheim fel biol, Yeshiva Univ, 56-57; res assoc pharmacol, NY Univ, 62-65; res assoc anat, 65-67, evolutionary biol, 67-71, RES ASSOC BIOL, UNIV CHICAGO, 71- Concurrent Pos: Consult, Standard Oil Co, 45-47 & Kings County Coroner, 47-49; NIH res grant, 65. Mem: Soc Study Evolution; Am Col Legal Med; Int Acad Path Res: Cytopathology; forensic cytology; paleocytopathology. Mailing Add: Dept of Biol Univ of Chicago Chicago IL 60637.

Nabi was supposedly born in 1910 in La Paz, Bolivia. After a precocious stay in medical school, he received an M.D. in 1936. He went on to attend grammar and secondary schools, finally receiving a Ph.D. at the Cochabamba University. For a period he resided in Buenos Aires, Argentina, as well as Caracas, Venezuela, where he headed the local affiliate of what was then called Esso Oil. He also was a practicing brain surgeon and editor of the revolutionary journal El Fomento. Despite his multi-tasking, he managed to publish a number of articles and addresses in population biology, evolution, and ecology.

== Controversy ==
In 1981, Nabi had a letter published in Nature complaining that Richard Dawkins suggested both that we were "robot vehicles blindly programmed to preserve the selfish molecules known as genes ... they control us body and mind" and that we need to fight against the tendencies of our genes. Similarly, E. O. Wilson has said that neurobiology provided "a genetically accurate and hence completely fair code of ethics" but also warned against the naturalistic fallacy.

Wilson complained to Nature magazine that Nabi was an invented character and insisted that he "lifted the two 1975 phrases of mine out of context in a way that reverses the meaning of one". The editors suggested that Nabi was a pseudonym of Lewontin's. Lewontin wrote to insist he was not "Isidore Nabi", citing Nabi's biography in American Men and Women of Science and editorial board position on Evolutionary Theory. Isidore Nabi replied to insist that he was not Isadore Nabi, the author of the letter.

This all led to a Nature editorial in the fall of 1981 which stated that Nabi was the pen name of Richard Lewontin, Leigh van Valen, and Richard Lester and decrying its use as deceptive. Richard Lester wrote an outraged reply insisting that he had not been involved at all and suggesting Nature was irresponsible in not checking with him first. The editors suggested that Richard Lester was a pseudonym of Richard Levins.
