= Milana Rocío =

Spanish trans entertainer (1960–2021)

- Born: 1960; Madrid, Spain
- Died: 2021 (aged 60–61)
- Occupation: Artist

Milana Rocío Vergara, known artistically as Emy, (1960–2021) was a transsexual artist best known for her performances on Calle del Oso in the Lavapiés neighborhood during the San Cayetano festivals.

== Biography ==
She was born in Madrid in 1960 and from a young age was closely linked to Calle del Oso, where her grandparents lived. In fact, at the age of 35 she moved permanently to this street.

Visible as a trans woman from a very young age, she took part in the first Madrid Pride March in 1978. For a time, she combined her work as a hairdresser on Calle del Oso with her work as a drag performer in Madrid and Benidorm.

In 1985, she began performing in the closing event of the Calle del Oso celebrations for the San Cayetano festival, alongside other trans and drag artists under the name Emy y compañía. In this show, the performers impersonated stars of Spanish music such as Rocío Jurado, Isabel Pantoja, and Lola Flores, among others. Always held on the night of August 7, this performance filled Calle del Oso and brought Vergara fame and recognition.

Vergara’s performance at the castizo San Cayetano festivals has been considered an example of Lavapiés' cultural blending. It is also one of the reasons the San Cayetano fair is popularly known as Little Pride (Orgullo Chico), due to the large gay audience it attracts.
