= The Apportionment of Human Diversity =

1972 scientific paper by Richard Lewontin

"The Apportionment of Human Diversity" is a 1972 paper on racial categorisation by American evolutionary biologist Richard Lewontin published in the book series Evolutionary Biology. In it, Lewontin presented an analysis of genetic diversity among people from different conventionally defined races. His main finding, that there is more genetic variation within these populations than between them, is considered a landmark in the study of human genetic variation and contributed to the abandonment of race as a scientific concept.

== Background ==
By the 1960s, anthropologists such as Frank B. Livingstone had concluded that "there are no races, there are only clines" – smooth gradients of genetic variation in a species across its geographic range. Lewontin's mentor Theodosius Dobzhansky challenged this, arguing that there are human discrete populations that can be distinguished by differences in the frequency of genetic traits, which he called races. At that time the debate was largely semantic, stemming from their different ideas about what race is and how it would be manifested in humans genetics. The evidence that was available to Livingstone and Dobzhansky was mostly limited to qualitative observations of phenotypes thought to express genetic variation (such as skin colour). This changed over the course of the 1960s, as new techniques began to produce direct evidence for genetic variation in humans at a molecular level. By 1972, when Dobzhansky invited Lewontin to contribute to his edited volume of Evolutionary Biology, Lewontin felt that there was sufficient data to look at the problem anew, from a "firm quantitative basis":

And so I thought, 'Well, we've got enough of this data, let's see what it tells us about the differences between human groups'. And so I just looked into the literature, and that literature was in books and so on. [...] One day I was going to give a lecture, I think it was in Carbondale, Illinois, or somewhere south. I was working in Chicago at the time. So I took a couple of these books with me and a pad of paper, and a table of logarithms which I needed for this purpose, and a little hand calculator, and I sat on this bus trip for three or four hours looking at the books, picking out the data, looking it up in the table of logarithms, doing a calculation, and writing it down in tables. And when I got back after the round trip I had all the data I needed to write the paper about how much human genetic variation there was, and so I did it.

— Richard Lewontin, in an interview in 2003.

Lewontin had been interested in using quantitative methods to assess taxonomic categories for some time before 1972. Over a decade earlier, palaeontologist George Gaylord Simpson had invited him to co-author a second edition of his textbook Quantitative Zoology (1960), and Lewontin added a chapter on the analysis of variance. In it, he illustrated how this approach could be used distinguish geographically distinct races with the example of Drosophila persimilis, a species of fruit fly. Though the method was similar to that he would later apply to human genetic variation, he reached the opposite conclusion: there was much greater genetic variance between geographic populations than between individual fruit flies, so there was a reasonable basis for distinguishing taxonomic races. Foreshadowing his later work on human genetic variation, he also emphasised that, because there will always be measurable differences between any two populations, it is the degree of difference compared to other axes of variation that will determine whether a grouping is biologically significant. "The Apportionment of Human Diversity" was published in a volume dedicated to Simpson, perhaps prompting Lewontin to recall this previous work.

== Findings ==
Lewontin performed a statistical analysis of the fixation index (F_{ST}) in populations drawn from seven classically defined "races" (Caucasian, African, Mongoloid, South Asian Aborigines, Amerinds, Oceanians, and Australian Aborigines). At that time, direct sequence data from the human genome was not sufficiently available, so he instead used 17 indirect markers, including blood group proteins. Lewontin found that the majority of the total genetic variation between humans (i.e., of the 0.1% of DNA that varies between individuals), 85.4%, is found within populations, 8.3% of the variation is found between populations within a "race", and only 6.3% was found to account for the racial classification. Numerous later studies have confirmed his findings. Based on this analysis, Lewontin concluded, "Since such racial classification is now seen to be of virtually no genetic or taxonomic significance either, no justification can be offered for its continuance."

== Reception ==
In a 2003 paper titled "Human Genetic Diversity: Lewontin's Fallacy", A. W. F. Edwards criticized Lewontin's conclusion that the practice of dividing humanity into races is taxonomically invalid because any given individual will often have more in common genetically with members of other population groups than with members of their own. Edwards argued that this does not refute the biological reality of race since genetic analysis can usually make correct inferences about the perceived race of a person from whom a sample is taken, and that the rate of success increases when more genetic loci are examined. Edwards argued that the probability of racial misclassification of an individual based on variation in a single genetic locus is approximately 30%, but the misclassification probability approaches zero when enough loci are studied.

Richard Dawkins, writing in 2004, concurred with Edwards' critique of Lewontin's argument, saying “However small the racial partition of the total variation may be, if such racial characteristics as there are are highly correlated with other racial characteristics, they are by definition informative, and therefore of taxonomic significance.”

Edwards' premise was disputed by Jonathan Marks, who argued that Edwards' critique does not actually contradict Lewontin's argument. A 2007 paper in Genetics by David J. Witherspoon et al. also concluded that the two arguments are in fact compatible, and that Lewontin's observation about the distribution of genetic differences across ancestral population groups applies "even when the most distinct populations are considered and hundreds of loci are used".

In a 2014 paper, Rasmus Grønfeldt Winther argues that "Lewontin's fallacy" is effectively a misnomer, as there really are two different sets of methods and questions at play in studying the genomic population structure of our species: "variance partitioning" and "clustering analysis". According to Winther, they are "two sides of the same mathematics coin" and neither "necessarily implies anything about the reality of human groups".

Charles Roseman argued in 2021 that it was Lewontin's critics, rather than Lewontin himself, who had committed the fallacy attributed to him. Roseman said that Lewontin's results depend on the correlated structure of genetic differences, and that Edwards had conflated different sources of genetic correlation, thus ignoring the very structure he had accused Lewontin of ignoring.

== Legacy ==
Many subsequent studies confirmed Lewontin's main finding.

The paper was not frequently cited in the years following its publication.

Fifty years after its publication, the paper was found to be frequently referenced in social media. In particular, Twitter users associated with far-right politics commonly used the term "Lewontin's fallacy" (referencing A. W. F. Edwards' 2003 critique of Lewontin) as a rhetorical device to dismiss scientific arguments against biological race. Commenting on the enduring significance afforded to Lewontin's paper in far-right and white nationalist discourse, geneticists Jedidiah Carlson and Kelley Harris proposed that "rejection of Lewontin's interpretation has become a tenet of white nationalist ideology".

In 2022, a special issue of the journal Philosophical Transactions of the Royal Society B: Biological Sciences was published with the theme "Celebrating 50 years since Lewontin's apportionment of human diversity", and a section of the book Remapping Race in a Global Context was devoted to discussing Lewontin's paper and defending it against Edwards' critique.
