= Richard Lewontin =

American evolutionary biologist and mathematician (1929–2021)

- Born: Richard Charles Lewontin; March 29, 1929; New York City, U.S.
- Died: July 4, 2021 (aged 92); Cambridge, Massachusetts, U.S.
- Education: Harvard University (BS); Columbia University (MS, PhD)
- Known for: Evolutionary biology Population genetics "The Apportionment of Human Diversity"; Not in Our Genes; The Dialectical Biologist; Spandrel
- Awards: Sewall Wright Award (1994); Crafoord Prize (2015); Thomas Hunt Morgan Medal (2017)
- Scientific career
- Fields: Genetics; Evolutionary biology Population genetics
- Workplaces: Harvard University; North Carolina State University; University of Rochester; University of Chicago; Columbia University
- Thesis: The Effects of Population Density and Composition on Viability in Drosophila melanogaster (1955)
- Doctoral advisor: Theodosius Dobzhansky
- Doctoral students: Adriana Briscoe; Jerry Coyne; Joseph Felsenstein; Martin Kreitman; Russell Lande; Belinda Chang; Hamish Spencer

Richard Charles Lewontin (March 29, 1929 – July 4, 2021) was an American evolutionary biologist, mathematician, geneticist, and social commentator. A leader in developing the mathematical basis of population genetics and evolutionary theory, he applied techniques from molecular biology, such as gel electrophoresis, to questions of genetic variation and evolution. He was a self-described Marxist.

In a pair of seminal 1966 papers co-authored with J. L. Hubby in the journal Genetics, Lewontin helped set the stage for the modern field of molecular evolution. In 1979, he and Stephen Jay Gould introduced the term "spandrel" into evolutionary theory. From 1973 to 1998, he held an endowed chair in zoology and biology at Harvard University, and from 2003 until his death in 2021 he was a research professor there.

From a sociological perspective, Lewontin strongly opposed genetic determinism.

== Early life and education ==
Lewontin was born in New York City to parents descended from late 19th-century Ashkenazi Jewish immigrants. His father was a broker of textiles, and his mother a homemaker. He attended Forest Hills High School and the École Libre des Hautes Études in New York. In 1951 he graduated from Harvard College with a BS degree in biology. In 1952, Lewontin received an MS degree in mathematical statistics, followed by a PhD degree in zoology in 1954, both from Columbia University, where he was a student of Theodosius Dobzhansky.

== Career ==
Lewontin held faculty positions at North Carolina State University, the University of Rochester, and the University of Chicago. In 1973, he was appointed as Alexander Agassiz Professor of Zoology and Professor of Biology at Harvard University, a position he held until 1998.

=== Work in population genetics ===
Lewontin worked in both theoretical and experimental population genetics. A hallmark of his work was an interest in new technology. In 1960, he and Ken-Ichi Kojima gave the equations for change of haplotype frequencies with interacting natural selection at two loci. Their paper gave a theoretical derivation of the equilibria expected, and also investigated the dynamics of the model by computer iteration. Lewontin later introduced the D' measure of linkage disequilibrium.

In 1966, he and J. L. Hubby published a paper that studied the amount of heterozygosity in a population. They used protein gel electrophoresis to survey dozens of loci in the fruit fly Drosophila pseudoobscura, and reported that a large fraction of the loci were polymorphic, and that at the average locus there was about a 15% chance that the individual was heterozygous. (Harry Harris reported similar results for humans at about the same time.) Previous work with gel electrophoresis had been reports of variation in single loci and did not give any sense of how common variation was.

Lewontin and Hubby's paper also discussed the possible explanation of the high levels of variability by either balancing selection or neutral mutation. Martin Kreitman was later to do a pioneering survey of population-level variability in DNA sequences while a Ph.D. student in Lewontin's lab.

=== Work on human genetic diversity ===
In a landmark paper published in 1972, Lewontin identified that most of the variation (80–85%) within human populations is found within local geographic groups, and differences attributable to the "race" groups defined in his study are a minor part of human genetic variability (1–15%). In a 2003 paper, A. W. F. Edwards criticized Lewontin's conclusion that race is an invalid taxonomic construct, terming it Lewontin's fallacy. He showed that the probability of racial misclassification of an individual based on variation in a single genetic locus is approximately 30%, but the misclassification probability becomes close to zero if enough loci are studied. That is, it appears that a majority of genetic variation is found within groups only if a single locus is used, but the reverse is true if analyzing a multiplicity of loci. Edwards' paper was commented on by Jonathan Marks, who argued that "the point of the theory of race was to discover large clusters of people that are principally homogeneous within and heterogeneous between, contrasting groups. Lewontin's analysis shows that such groups do not exist in the human species, and Edwards' critique does not contradict that interpretation."

=== Affiliations ===
As of 2003, Lewontin was the Alexander Agassiz Research Professor at Harvard. He has worked with and had great influence on many philosophers of biology, including William C. Wimsatt, Elliott Sober, Philip Kitcher, Elisabeth Lloyd, Peter Godfrey-Smith, Sahotra Sarkar, and Robert Brandon, often inviting them to work in his lab.

Since 2013, Lewontin has been listed on the Advisory Council of the National Center for Science Education.

== Debates within mainstream evolutionary biology ==
In 1975, when E. O. Wilson's book Sociobiology proposed evolutionary explanations for human social behaviors, biologists, including Lewontin and his Harvard colleagues Stephen Jay Gould and Ruth Hubbard, responded negatively.

Lewontin and Gould introduced the term spandrel to evolutionary biology, inspired by the architectural term "spandrel", in an influential 1979 paper, "The Spandrels of San Marco and the Panglossian Paradigm: A Critique of the Adaptationist Programme." "Spandrels" were described as features of an organism that exist as a necessary consequence of other (perhaps adaptive) features, but do not directly improve fitness (and thus are not necessarily adaptive). This critique sparked both controversy and a revolution in the study of selection by evolutionary biologists. The subsequent 5–20 years consequently saw some of the most novel and rigorous methods to quantify selection in the wild and lab, test for selection phylogenetically, and reconcile the effects of other evolutionary processes (e.g., drift, gene flow, development, historical contingency); all of which resulted in a sort-of renaissance in evolutionary biology.

Lewontin was an early proponent of a hierarchy of levels of selection in his article, "The Units of Selection". He has been a major influence on philosophers of biology, notably William C. Wimsatt (who taught with Lewontin and Richard Levins at the University of Chicago), Robert Brandon and Elisabeth Lloyd (who studied with Lewontin as graduate students), Philip Kitcher, Elliott Sober, and Sahotra Sarkar. Lewontin briefly argued for the historical nature of biological causality in the article "Is Nature Probable or Capricious?".

In an article titled "Organism and Environment", published in the journal Scientia, and in more popular form in the last chapter of Biology as Ideology, Lewontin argued that while traditional Darwinism has portrayed the organism as a passive recipient of environmental influences, a correct understanding should emphasize the organism as an active constructor of its own environment. Ecological niches are not pre-formed, empty receptacles into which organisms are inserted, but are defined and created by organisms. The organism-environment relationship is reciprocal and dialectical. M. W. Feldman and others have developed Lewontin's conception in more detailed models under the term niche construction.

In the adaptationist view of evolution, the organism is a function of both the organism and environment, while the environment is only a function of itself. The environment is seen as autonomous and unshaped by the organism. Lewontin instead believed in a constructivist view, in which the organism is a function of the organism and environment, with the environment being a function of the organism and environment as well. This means that the organism shapes the environment as the environment shapes the organism. The organism shapes the environment for future generations.

Lewontin criticized traditional neo-Darwinian approaches to adaptation. In his article "Adaptation" in the Italian Enciclopedia Einaudi, and in a modified version for Scientific American, he emphasized the need to give an engineering characterization of adaptation separate from measurement of number of offspring, rather than simply assuming organs or organisms are at adaptive optima. Lewontin said that his more general, technical criticism of adaptationism grew out of his recognition that the fallacies of sociobiology reflect fundamentally flawed assumptions of adaptiveness of all traits in much of the modern evolutionary synthesis.

Lewontin accused neo-Darwinists of telling Just-So Stories when they try to show how natural selection explains such novelties as long-necked giraffes.

=== Sociobiology and evolutionary psychology ===
Along with others, such as Gould, Lewontin was a persistent critic of some themes in neo-Darwinism. Specifically, he criticized proponents of sociobiology and evolutionary psychology, such as Edward O. Wilson and Richard Dawkins, who attempt to explain animal behaviour and social structures in terms of evolutionary advantage or strategy. He and others criticize this approach when applied to humans, as he sees it as genetic determinism. In his writing, Lewontin suggests a more nuanced view of evolution is needed, which requires a more careful understanding of the context of the whole organism as well as the environment.

Such concerns about what he viewed as the oversimplification of genetics led Lewontin to be a frequent participant in debates, and an active life as a public intellectual. He lectured widely to promote his views on evolutionary biology and science. In the book Not in Our Genes (co-authored with Steven Rose and Leon J. Kamin) and numerous articles, Lewontin questioned much of the claimed heritability of human behavioral traits, such as intelligence as measured by IQ tests.

Some academics have criticized him for rejecting sociobiology for non-scientific reasons. Edward Wilson (1995) suggested that Lewontin's political beliefs affected his scientific view; Wilson privately referred to Lewontin as the "McCarthy of the Left", the "American Lysenko", and "the chief witchhunter" of his time. Richard Dawkins (2004) described Lewontin's "political convictions and his weakness for dragging them into science at every possible opportunity". Lewontin at times identified himself as Marxist, and asserted that his philosophical views have bolstered his scientific work.

=== History of science ===
Robert E. Rosenwein criticised Lewontin's assertion made in The Dialectical Biologist that the history of evolutionary biology is connected to sociocultural justification for the success of the bourgeois class. Calling Lewontin's claims "facile" and "glib", Rosenwein stated that Lewontin never explained or drew a direct, causal connection between how the rise and evolution of capitalism related to developments in the biological sciences.

=== Agribusiness ===
Lewontin has written on the economics of agribusiness. He has contended that hybrid corn was developed and propagated not because of its superior quality, but because it allowed agribusiness corporations to force farmers to buy new seed each year rather than plant seed produced by their previous crop of corn (Lewontin 1982). Lewontin testified in an unsuccessful suit in California challenging the state's financing of research to develop automatic tomato pickers. This favored the profits of agribusiness over the employment of farm workers (Lewontin 2000).

== Personal life ==
As of mid-2015, Lewontin and his wife Mary Jane (Christianson) lived in a log cabin he built with his family in the 1970's in Marlboro, Vermont. Lewontin served many years as a volunteer firefighter in Marlboro and also served as a trustee for the Marlboro Music Festival. Dick and Mary Jane had four sons. He was an atheist.

Lewontin died at his home in Cambridge, Massachusetts on July 4, 2021, at the age of 92.

== Recognition ==
- 1961: Fulbright Fellowship
- 1961: National Science Foundation Senior Postdoctoral Fellow
- 1968: Elected member of the National Academy of Sciences (resigned in 1972)
- 1994: Sewall Wright Award from the American Society of Naturalists
- 2015: Crafoord Prize from the Royal Swedish Academy of Sciences (shared with Tomoko Ohta)
- 2017: Thomas Hunt Morgan Medal from the Genetics Society of America

== Bibliography ==
- Lewontin, R. C.; Kojima, K. (December 1960). "The Evolutionary Dynamics of Complex Polymorphisms". Evolution. 14 (4). Society for the Study of Evolution: 458–472. doi:10.2307/2405995. JSTOR 2405995.
- Lewontin, R. C. (January 1966). "Is Nature Probable or Capricious?". BioScience. 16 (1, Logic in Biological Investigation). University of California Press: 25–27. doi:10.2307/1293548. JSTOR 1293548.
- Lewontin, R. C. (1970). "The Units of Selection". Annual Review of Ecology and Systematics. 1 (1): 1–18. Bibcode:1970AnRES...1....1L. doi:10.1146/annurev.es.01.110170.000245. S2CID 84684420.
- "The Apportionment of Human Diversity," Evolutionary Biology, vol. 6 (1972) pp. 391–398.
- Lewontin, R. C. (1974). The Genetic Basis of Evolutionary Change. New York: Columbia University Press. ISBN 0-231-03392-3.
- "Adattamento," Enciclopedia Einaudi, (1977) vol. 1, 198–214.
- "Adaptation," Scientific American, vol. 239, (1978) 212–228.
- Gould, S. J.; Lewontin, R. C. (1979). "The Spandrels of San Marco and the Panglossian Paradigm: A Critique of the Adaptationist Programme". Proceedings of the Royal Society B: Biological Sciences. 205 (1161): 581–98. Bibcode:1979RSPSB.205..581G. doi:10.1098/rspb.1979.0086. PMID 42062. S2CID 2129408.
- Lewontin, R. C. (1982). Human diversity. New York: Scientific American Library. ISBN 0-7167-6013-4.
- "The Organism as Subject and Object of Evolution," Scientia vol. 188 (1983) 65–82.
- Not in Our Genes: Biology, Ideology and Human Nature (with Steven Rose and Leon J. Kamin) (1984) ISBN 0-394-72888-2.
- The Dialectical Biologist (with Richard Levins), Harvard University Press (1985) ISBN 0-674-20283-X.
- Biology as Ideology: The Doctrine of DNA (1991) ISBN 0-06-097519-9.
- The Triple Helix: Gene, Organism, and Environment, Harvard University Press (2000) ISBN 0-674-00159-1.
- It Ain't Necessarily So: The Dream of the Human Genome and Other Illusions, New York Review of Books (2000).
- Biology Under The Influence: Dialectical Essays on the Coevolution of Nature and Society (with Richard Levins), (2007).
- Agricultural research and the penetration of capital (1982), Science for the People 14 (1): 12–17
- Lewontin, R.C. The maturing of capitalist agriculture: farmer as proletarian. P. 93–106 in F. Magdoff, J. B. Foster, and F. H. Buttel, Eds. 2000. Hungry for Profit: The Agribusiness Threat to Farmers, Food, and the Environment. Monthly Review Press, NY.
