= James Krieger =

American public-health researcher

Jim Krieger
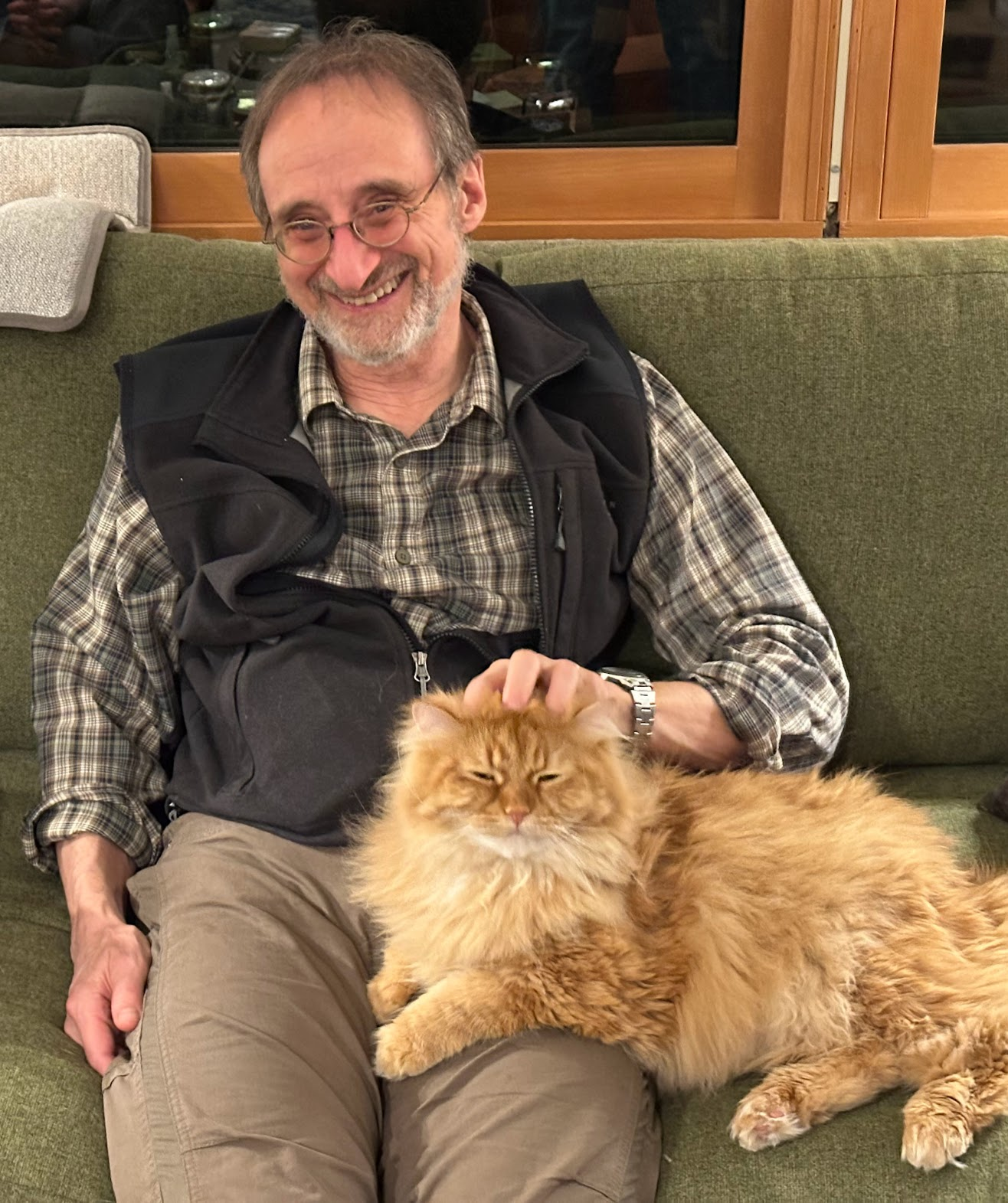

James W. "Jim" Krieger is an American public-health researcher, epidemiologist, and Clinical Professor of Medicine at the University of Washington, where he also has a secondary appointment as a professor of Health Services. He is also the founding executive director of Healthy Food America. He was formerly the Chief of Epidemiology, Planning and Evaluation for Public Health – Seattle & King County. He is the older brother of fellow public-health researcher Nancy Krieger. He graduated from Harvard College, University of California, San Francisco, and the University of Washington.

== Work ==
Krieger is known for his work on social determinants of health, such as asthma, which he worked to successfully reduce in Seattle through the Healthy Homes and Breathe Easy Homes projects. He oversaw the construction of the Breathe Easy Homes, an idea originally proposed by Bonita Blake. He has also researched the health effects of fruit juice consumption.
