= John H. Edwards =

British geneticist (1928–2007)

John Hilton Edwards FRS
- Born: 26 March 1928; London, England
- Died: 11 October 2007 (aged 79); Oxford, England
- Education: Trinity Hall, Cambridge
- Known for: Description of trisomy 18 syndrome (Edwards syndrome)
- Spouse: Felicity Claire Toussaint
- Children: Four: Vanessa, Conrad, Penelope and Matthew
- Parents: Harold C. Edwards (father); Ida (mother)
- Relatives: A. W. F. Edwards (brother)
- Scientific career
- Fields: Medical genetics
- Workplaces: University of Birmingham, Oxford University, Children's Hospital of Philadelphia
- Academic advisors: Lancelot Hogben

John Hilton Edwards (26 March 1928 – 11 October 2007) was a British medical geneticist. Edwards reported the first description of a syndrome of multiple congenital malformations associated the presence of an extra chromosome. The extra chromosome belonged to the E group of chromosomes which consisted of chromosomes 16, 17 and 18. The condition is now known as Edwards syndrome or trisomy 18 syndrome.

His original description incorrectly showed trisomy seventeen.

== Life and career ==
Edwards was the elder son of the surgeon Harold C. Edwards, and the brother of the geneticist and statistician A. W. F. Edwards. He was educated at Uppingham School and Trinity Hall, Cambridge, where some uninspiring courses led him to take only a third in part I of the natural sciences tripos, although he did later graduate with an MB and BChir after further study at Middlesex and Central Middlesex hospitals. Early in his career, he worked under Lancelot Hogben, and was sometimes distinguished from his brother as "Hogben's Edwards".

After working for several years as a ship's surgeon and as a population geneticist, Edwards became a consultant paediatrician at hospitals in Philadelphia and Birmingham, England. At the same time, he was first a lecturer, reader and then later Professor of Human Genetics at Birmingham University, remaining in situ until 1979. From 1967 to 1968, he was Visiting Professor of Pediatrics at Cornell University and a Senior Investigator at the New York Blood Center.

In 1979, Edwards was elected to a fellowship of the Royal Society. That same year, he was made a Fellow of Keble College, Oxford, and Professor of Genetics at the University of Oxford, where he remained until his retirement in 1995.
