= Nancy Krieger =

Social epidemiologist

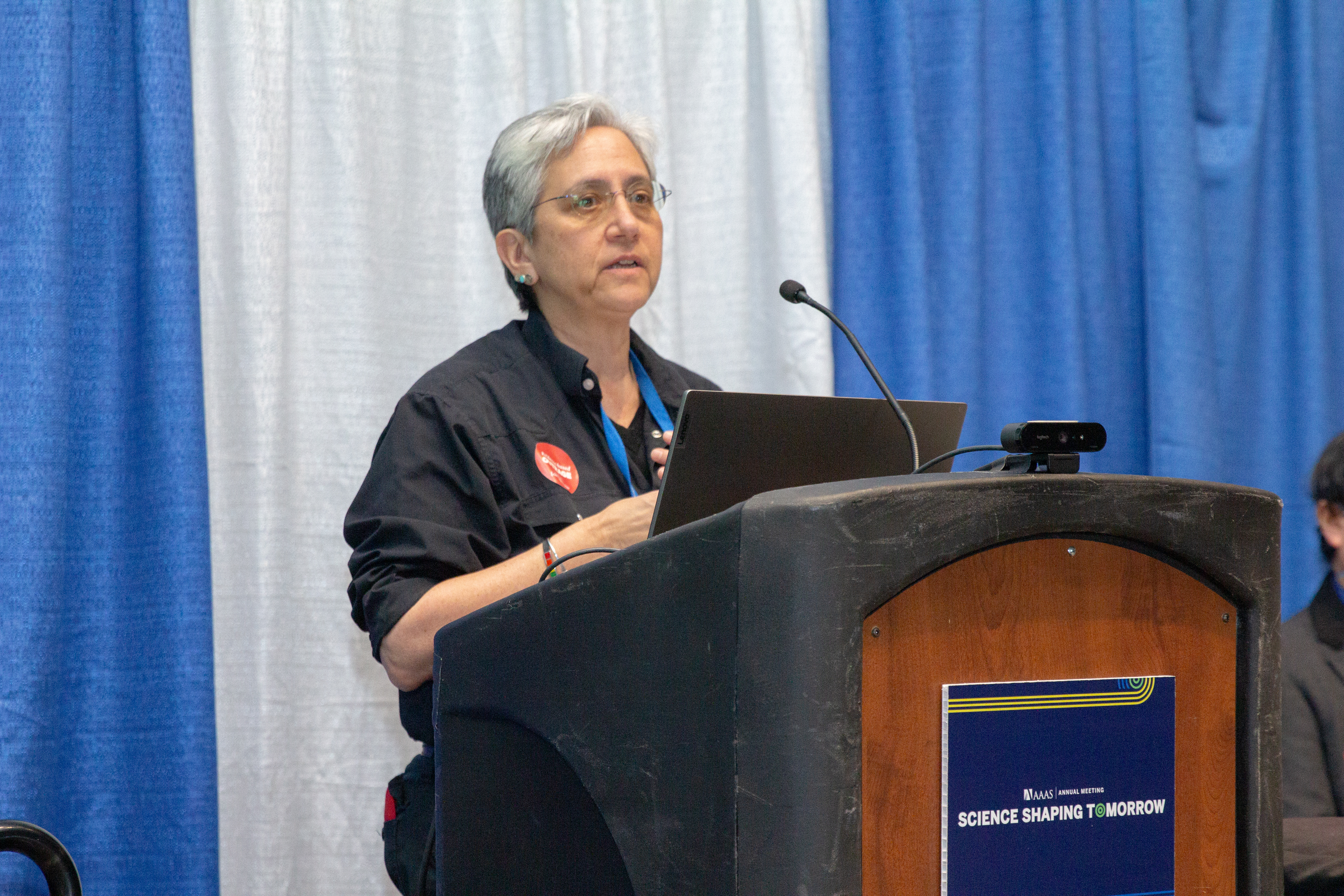
- Born: Nancy Jane Krieger
- Education: Harvard University; University of Washington; University of California, Berkeley
- Known for: Ecosocial theory Race and health in the United States
- Awards: United States Department of Health and Human Services Innovation in Prevention Award (2003)
- Scientific career
- Fields: Epidemiology; Public health
- Institutions: Harvard School of Public Health
- Thesis: Race, class, and health: studies of breast cancer and hypertension (1989)

Nancy Krieger is an American epidemiologist who is professor of social epidemiology in the Department of Social and Behavioral Sciences at the Harvard T.H. Chan School of Public Health.

== Education and career ==
Raised on the Upper East Side of Manhattan, Krieger studied biochemistry as an undergraduate at Harvard University and earned a master's degree at the University of Washington. Krieger received her PhD in epidemiology from University of California, Berkeley in 1989. She joined the faculty of the Harvard T.H. Chan School of Public Health in 1995. In 2004, she became an ISI highly cited researcher.

== Research ==
Krieger has conducted research on the relationship between racism, social class, and health in the United States since the 1980s. In 2008, she conducted research that found that socioeconomic disparities in mortality rates had narrowed from 1966 to 1980, but had widened since then. In 2015, she and her colleagues published a paper arguing that law enforcement-related deaths in the United States should be a "notifiable condition", meaning that public health workers would have to report such deaths to a state or local agency. Krieger co-founded the American Public Health Association's Spirit of 1848 caucus which centers their attention on ways to limit social inequities in health. In January 2023, the National Institute of Health granted over $3.3 million towards her groups project examining the effects of discrimination on sleep disorders and psychological distress.

== Personal life ==
Krieger is one of two children of endocrinologist Dorothy Krieger and neurologist Howard Krieger. Her brother, Jim Krieger, is the director of Healthy Food America.
