= Harold C. Edwards =

British surgeon

Harold Clifford Edwards CBE FRCS FRCOG FACS (hon.) (15 August 1899 – 2 August 1989) was a British surgeon. His sons were the geneticists John H. Edwards (1928–2007) and A. W. F. Edwards (1935–). He was appointed a Commander of the Order of the British Empire in 1945.
