= The Dialectical Biologist =

1985 book on biological research

- Cover of the first edition
- Authors: Richard Levins; Richard Lewontin
- Language: English
- Subject: Biology
- Publisher: Harvard University Press
- Publication date: 1985
- Publication place: United States
- Media type: Print (Hardcover and Paperback)
- Pages: 336
- ISBN: 978-0674202832

The Dialectical Biologist is a 1985 book by the ecologist Richard Levins and the biologist Richard Lewontin, in which the authors sketch a dialectical approach to biology. They see "dialectics" more as a set of questions to ask about biological research, a weapon against dogmatism, than as a set of pre-determined answers.

They focus on the (dialectical) relationship between the "whole" (or totality) and the "parts." "Part makes whole, and whole makes part". That is, a biological system of some kind consists of a collection of heterogeneous parts. All of these contribute to the character of the whole, as in reductionist thinking. On the other hand, the whole has a nature of its own and feeds back to affect and determine the nature of the parts. This back-and-forth (dialectic) of causation implies a dynamic process.

For example, Darwinian evolution points to the competition of a variety of species, each with heterogeneous members, within a given environment. This leads to changing species and even to new species arising. A dialectical biologist fully accepts this picture then looks for ways in which the competing creatures (which serve as the internal conflicts in the environment) lead to changes. The changes manifest in the creatures themselves, through the creatures embracing biological adaptations that provide them with advantages, and in the environment itself, as when the action of microbes encourages the erosion of rocks. Further, each species is part of the "environment" of all the others.
