= Castizo =

Mixed-race individuals in the Spanish Empire

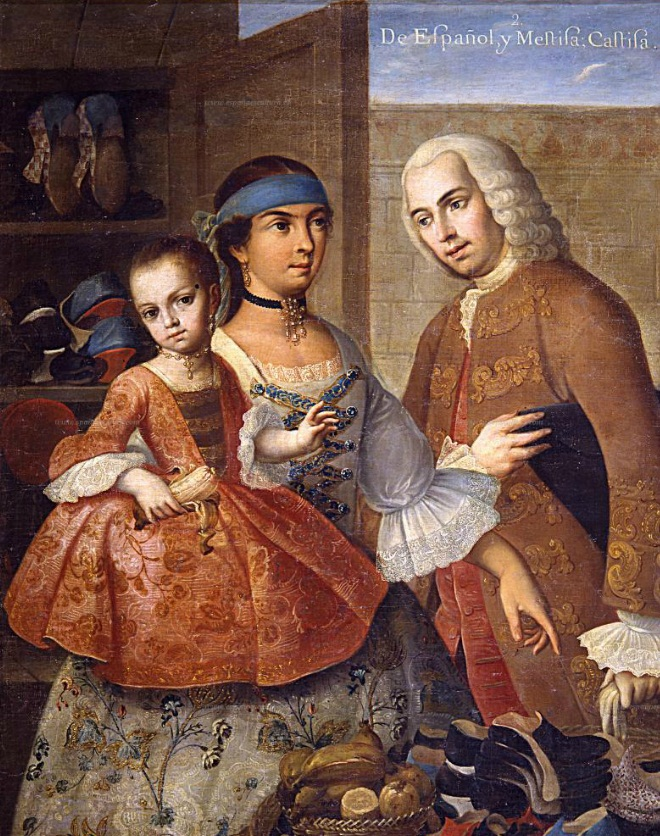
The child of a Spaniard (right) and a mestiza (middle) is a castiza. By Miguel Cabrera. (1763)

Castizo (Note: Pronunciation in Latin American Spanish: [kasˈtiso]) (fem. Castiza) is a racial category used in Spanish America to refer to people who are three-quarters Spanish and one-quarter Amerindian. The category of castizo was widely recognized by the 18th century in colonial Mexico and was a standard category portrayed in eighteenth-century casta paintings.

A castizo is a person of predominantly European (usually Spanish) ancestry with a smaller proportion of Indigenous ancestry—typically three-quarters Spanish and one-quarter Amerindian. This term is widely used in colonial Spanish America to describe individuals who, despite some Indigenous ancestry, often appeared and were socially treated as white.

Physical traits of castizos often reflect strong Mediterranean features, such as:

- Olive to light skin tones, sometimes with warm or golden undertones.
- Straight or wavy dark brown hair, occasionally with lighter streaks.
- Facial structure that is typically European: straight or aquiline nose, angular jawline, medium to high cheekbones.
- Eyes are usually brown or hazel, but green and lighter tones can appear depending on family background.
- Overall appearance is often indistinguishable from Southern Europeans, especially Spaniards from regions like Andalusia, Extremadura, or the Canary Islands.

Castizos and Euro-mestizos are most commonly found in Latin American regions with a strong Spanish colonial heritage and relatively low Indigenous admixture. These regions include:

- Northern Mexico (e.g., Chihuahua, Sonora, Nuevo León): Populations here often show high European ancestry and Mediterranean traits due to historical settlement patterns.
- Central Mexico (e.g., Jalisco, Guanajuato, Puebla): Although more mixed, many individuals still retain pronounced Mediterranean features.
- Chile: Especially in the central and southern regions, many Chileans have predominantly Spanish ancestry with minor Indigenous admixture; in south regions, Chileans of mixed German & minor indigenous descent exist.
- Argentina: Particularly in Buenos Aires and the central provinces, the population is largely of European descent, often Mediterranean (Spanish and Italian).
- Southern Brazil (e.g., Rio Grande do Sul, Santa Catarina): Although Portuguese-speaking, these areas have large populations of European descent, including Portuguese, Italian, and German, with some Indigenous admixture.
- Canary Island-descended communities in Latin America: Found in Venezuela, Cuba, Puerto Rico and parts of Mexico, these populations often retain Mediterranean features; in Venezuela, dominant Italian & German blood admixture even exist.

== History ==
In the taxonomic chart accompanying a work on casta paintings, castizo is given as "uncertain origin". It appears in 1543 with the meaning "class, condition, social position" (calidad, clase o condición).

The term castizo applied to the offspring of a union of a Spaniard and a mestiza (offspring of a Spaniard and an indigenous woman); that is, someone who is of three-quarters Spanish and one-quarter Amerindian ancestry. During this era, various other terms (mestizo, cuarterón de indio, etc.) were also used.

Most scholars do not view the racial labels and hierarchical ordering as a rigid or official "system of castes," since there was considerable fluidity in the designations. Individuals might be classified or identify themselves with different categories at different points in their lives. Sometimes different labels were used simultaneously in the same documentation.

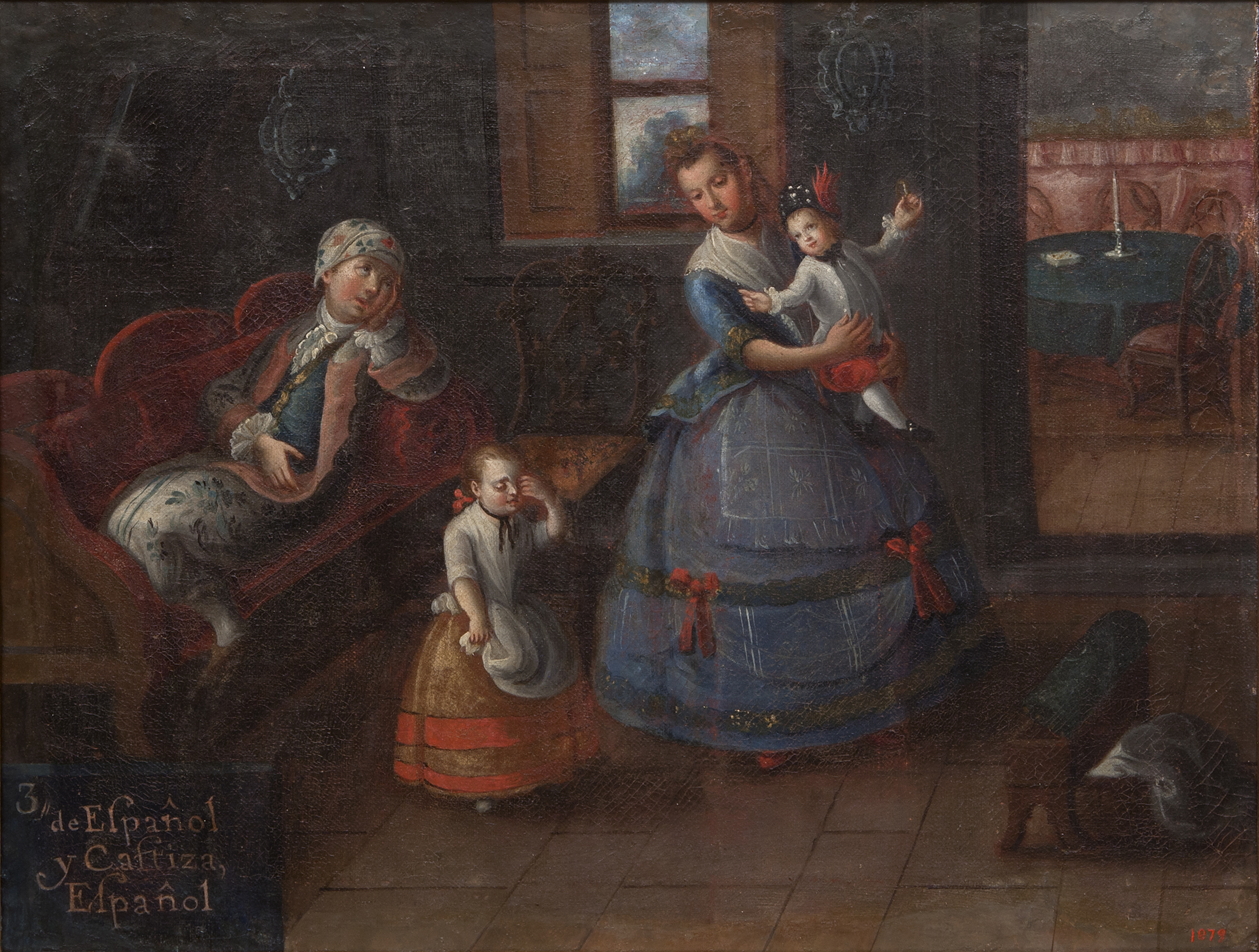
From Spaniard and Castiza, Spaniard (1799).

Marriage licenses required a declaration of racial status for each partner. The category castizo "was widely recognized by the eighteenth century; castizos still did not appear in great numbers [in parish documentation] even though they were widely distributed throughout New Spain." In colonial censuses, officials sought to keep track of certain categories, particularly where a person could claim to be a Spaniard. "In the [colonial Mexican] censuses of white/mestizo households, provisions were made to keep accurate records of castizos. The flexibility of having three categories (mestizo, castizo, and español) provided census takers a broader framework within which to capture differences of phenotype — presumably in hopes of closely regulating entry into the coveted español caste." Some were classified as castizos rather than españoles, but "their castizo status allowed them to maintain social elevation with the broader mestizo mainstream."

In the 1778 census that was carried out in the territory of present-day Argentina during the mandate of King Carlos III of Spain, the castizos were counted as whites along with the criollos. In total there were 69,804 whites, which represented 37.54% of the population, this census was carried out by Viceroy Juan José de Vértiz y Salcedo.

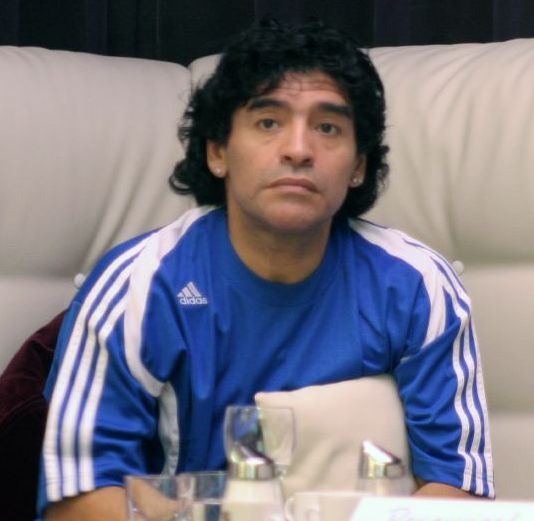
Diego Maradona was a descendant of Galician, Italian and Croatian immigrants, and of Guaraní natives.

An eighteenth-century visitor to colonial Mexico published the following observation about race mixture between Spaniards and Amerindians:

"If the mixed-blood is the offspring of a Spaniard and an Indian, the stigma [of race mixture] disappears at the third step in descent because it is held as systematic that a Spaniard and an Indian produce a mestizo; a mestizo and a Spaniard, a castizo; and a castizo and a Spaniard, a Spaniard. [Note: This person is 7/8 Spanish by ancestry]. The admixture of Indian blood should not indeed be regarded as a blemish, since the provisions of law give the Indian all that he could wish for, and Philip II granted to mestizos the privilege of becoming priests. On this consideration is based the common estimation of descent from a union of Indian and European or creole Spaniard."

In the early 21st century, the term castizo has also come to mean mixed-race people with light skin, in comparison to mulattos, pardos, cholos, moriscos and coyotes, who would be mixed-race people with darker skin.

== See also ==
- Caucasian
- Amerindian
- Casta
- White Latin American
- Spaniards
- Cholo
- Mestizo
- Quadroon
- Peninsulares
