= Katey Stone =

American ice hockey coach (born 1966)

Katey Stone (born April 17, 1966) is a retired Division I women's ice hockey coach. Stone accumulated 494 victories and has coached 25 seasons as a head coach with the Harvard Crimson. Stone was the third coach in women's college hockey history to win 300 games. In 2023, reporting from the Boston Globe and The Athletic accused Stone of hazing and abuse, prompting Harvard to open an external investigation. In June 2023, Stone announced her retirement.

== Early life ==
Stone attended the Taft School, Watertown, Connecticut and graduated in the class of 1984. Stone was a captain and four-year letter winner in hockey for the New Hampshire Wildcats women's ice hockey program. Stone was part of two ECAC championships in 1986 and 1987. In addition to ice hockey, Stone was an accomplished lacrosse player at New Hampshire and was part of the team that won the 1985 NCAA title. She graduated in 1989 with a degree in physical education. Before Harvard, Stone coached at Tabor Academy, Northfield Mount Hermon School and Phillips Exeter Academy.

== Harvard Crimson ==
During her tenure, Stone accumulated a record of 523–284–58. Before the 1994–95 season, Stone replaced John Dooley as the Crimson head coach. In her first year, Stone put together a record of 12–11–2. Over the next three seasons, the Crimson would finish below .500. In 1998–99, the Crimson would go from 14–16–0 to 33–1–0. Under Stone, the club won the national championship in 1998–99. During her 11th season at Harvard (2004–05), Stone coached the Crimson to a second consecutive ECAC title. In the 2004 part of the campaign, the Crimson had a 7–6–1 start. After January 1, Stone led the team to an 18–0–2 finish. The Crimson qualified for their third straight Frozen Four appearance despite losing graduating Patty Kazmaier Award winners from the past two seasons.

In 2013–2014, Stone stepped away from the bench at Harvard to be head coach for the US Olympic women's ice hockey team. She was the first woman to be named head coach for any US Hockey team at the Olympics. The US squad took home the silver medal at the Sochi Olympics, losing in the championship game to Team Canada.

With Stone back behind the bench, the 2014–2015 Crimson women's ice hockey team had a highly successful season, winning the Beanpot, the Ivy League championship, and finishing atop the standings in the ECAC at the close of the season. They went on to win the ECAC tournament, and advanced to the NCAA Frozen Four, where they lost to the Minnesota Golden Gophers in the Championship game, and finished as national runners-up.

On February 26, 2010, the Crimson defeated the Princeton Tigers women's ice hockey program by a 5–1 score. With the win, Katey Stone became women's college hockey's all-time winningest coach, surpassing former Minnesota Golden Gophers women's ice hockey head coach Laura Halldorson. At the end of the 2019–2020, she was ranked fourth in number of wins for college women's hockey coaches.

On June 6, 2023, Stone announced her retirement.

Stone is a member of the NCAA Championship committee and a former president of the American Women's Hockey Coaches Association.

=== Players ===
Stone coached nine players who have competed in ice hockey at the Winter Olympic Games. In addition, six of the first 12 winners of the Patty Kazmaier Memorial Award (Jennifer Botterill twice, Julie Chu, A.J. Mleczko, Angela Ruggiero and Sarah Vaillancourt) were players under Stone's tutelage. Players for the Crimson have earned All-America honors a total of 21 times since the 1998–99 season. These All-Americans include the first players to be four-time first-team All-Americans: Jennifer Botterill and Angela Ruggiero. Stone has also coached eight ECAC Players of the Year, nine Ivy League Players of the Year, four ECAC Rookies of the Year, and five Ivy League Rookies of the Year.

== Postseason ==
- 1999 AWCHA national championship
- Three consecutive appearances in the NCAA championship game (2003, 2004, 2005)
- Eight NCAA tournament appearances

=== Titles ===
(Until end of 2010 season)

- Six ECAC regular-season titles
- Five ECAC tournament championships
- Five Ivy League titles
- 10 Beanpot championships

== International ==
Stone coached the 1996 U.S. National Team. Ten years later, she was the head coach of the U.S. Women's Under-22 Team. Stone was the head coach of the gold-medal winning U.S. Women's Under-18 National Team at the World Championships in January 2008. In November 2008, she led the US National Team to the gold medal at the Four Nations Cup. Stone led Team USA's National Team to a gold medal in the 2013 World Championships and was the head coach of Team USA in Sochi, Russia for the 2014 Olympic Games. Team USA earned the silver medal, falling to Team Canada in the gold medal game. Team USA held a 2–0 lead late in the game, before surrendering two goals in the final four minutes of regulation time. Team Canada scored the gold medal winning goal in the ninth minute of overtime.

== Hazing and abuse accusations ==
In January 2023 the Boston Globe published a report about hazing and abuse in Stone's program, followed up by a report in March in the Athletic, accusing Stone of running “a mental-health Hunger Games.” Following these reports, Harvard hired law firm Jenner & Block to conduct an investigation of the university's women’s ice hockey program.

== Awards and honors ==
- 1999 AHCA Coach of the Year
- 2004–05 USCHO.com Coach of the Year
- 2014 NCAA Silver Anniversary Award

== See also ==
- List of college women's ice hockey career coaching wins leaders
- Tamara Awerbuch-Friedlander
