= The Genetic Basis of Evolutionary Change =

1974 book by Richard Lewontin

- Author: Richard Lewontin
- Subject: Evolutionary genetics
- Publisher: Columbia University Press
- Publication date: 1974
- Pages: 346
- ISBN: 0231033923
- OCLC: 749819

The Genetic Basis of Evolutionary Change is a book by Richard Lewontin about evolutionary genetics. Originally published by Columbia University Press in 1974, the book originated in a series of lectures, known as the "Jesup lectures", that Lewontin gave at Columbia University in 1969. In a blurb promoting the book, Columbia University Press claimed that it "will surely become one of the landmarks in twentieth-century science", for which they were criticized by some of the book's reviewers. James F. Crow, for example, argued that the Columbia employees who chose to describe the book in this way "should have their wrists slapped", adding, "...this is not the Origin of Species. It is just a thoughtful, readable, and very stimulating book."

== Reviews ==
In his review of The Genetic Basis of Evolutionary Change, Donald J. Nash described it as "...a fine addition to the series of volumes on evolutionary biology published by Columbia University Press." Joseph Felsenstein also reviewed the book favorably, describing it as "...the book we always knew Dick Lewontin could write" and "...a brilliant comprehensive introductory review of the controversy over the evolutionary significance of protein polymorphisms." In his review of the book, James F. Crow described it as "a fine book", praising Lewontin for his "gift for seeing problems clearly, for marshalling the relevant evidence, and for presenting all this in an interesting way." Crow concluded that "[i]n the areas in which there has been the greatest controversy, Lewontin has presented the scientific issues fairly and objectively." However, Crow also criticized Lewontin for inserting "irrelevant social and political statements" into several parts of the book. In his review of the book for Science, Bryan Clarke described it as "...a remarkable book", adding that "[i]t will, no doubt, be necessary fare for future generations of undergraduates, and it will certainly benefit their intellectual nutrition.

== Influence ==
The Genetic Basis of Evolutionary Change has been retrospectively described as a "landmark book". In 1999, philosopher Michael Ruse wrote that Lewontin, by publishing the book, had "thereby establish[ed] himself (if there had been hitherto doubt) as the dominant figure in the genetics of evolution".
