= Cristina Possas =

Brazilian public health scientist

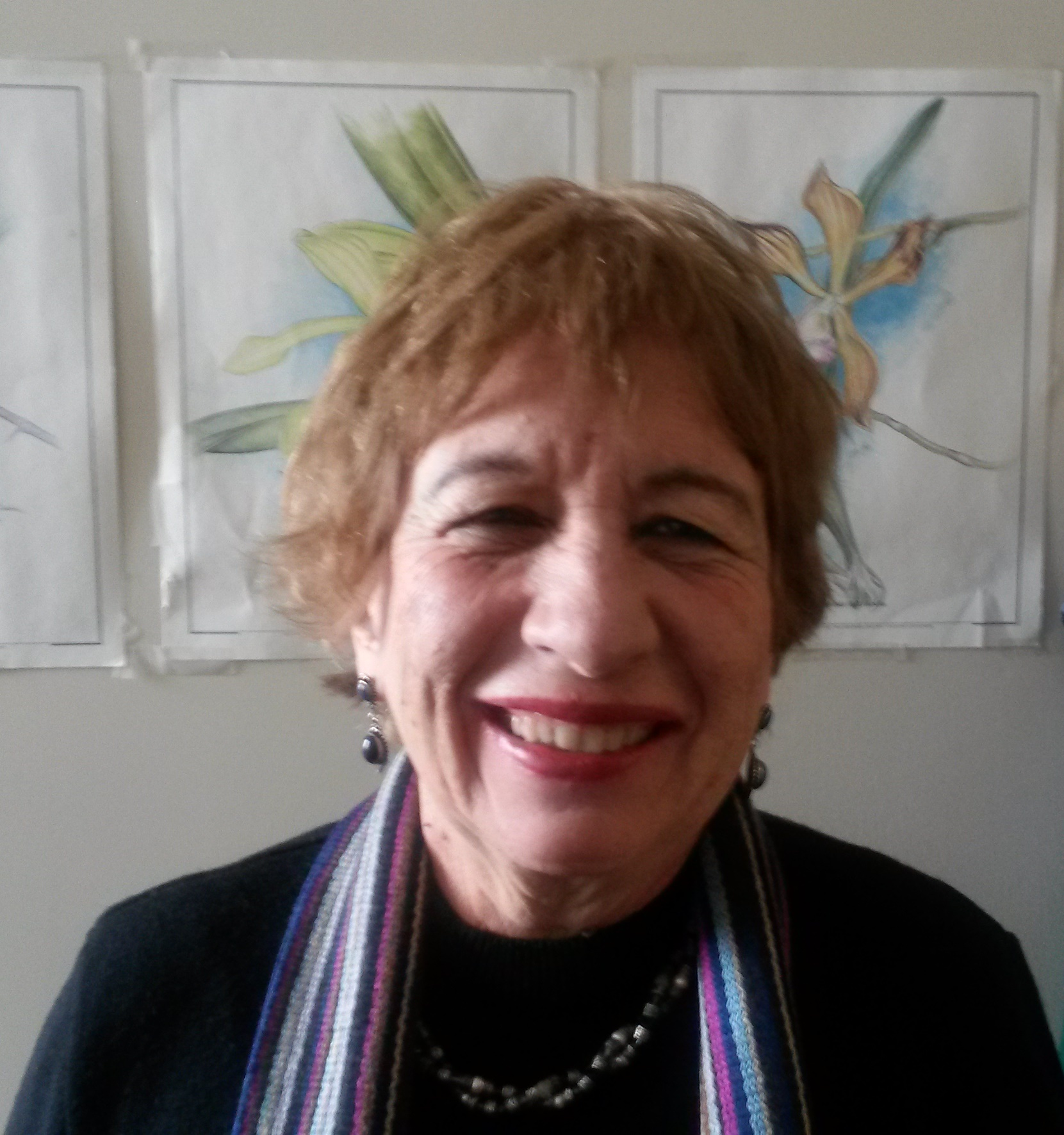
- Born: June 5, 1948 (age 78); Rio de Janeiro, Brazil
- Education: FIOCRUZ PhD (1988); Unicamp MSocSc (1980); PUC-Rio PhD (1972)
- Occupations: Minister of health, public health research scientist, infectious disease research scientist, academic
- Years active: 1985–present
- Employer: Fiocruz
- Known for: Social epidemiology; emerging infectious diseases

Cristina Possas de Albuquerque (5 June 1948 - 11 May 2026) is a Brazilian public health scientist working with infectious diseases and emerging infectious diseases from an eco-social perspective.

She is a Takemi Fellow at Harvard University in Boston, where for 10 years she has been a visiting scientist and a Fulbright Fellow. She has been since 1976 a professor at FIOCRUZ in Rio de Janeiro, Brazil.

== Education and employment ==
After her undergraduate studies, Possas completed a PhD in psychology at the Pontifical Catholic University of Rio de Janeiro (PUC-RIO) in 1972. After completing her MSocSc at the State University of Campinas (UNICAMP) in 1980 Possas was appointed to the Oswaldo Cruz Foundation (Portuguese Fundação Oswaldo Cruz, also known as FIOCRUZ) in Rio de Janeiro, Brazil as a full professor in 1985 where she has worked ever since, completing a public health PhD at the National School of Public Health in 1988.

Whilst working at FIOCRUZ she has also spent time as a Fulbright Fellow and Takemi Fellow in International Health at Harvard University from 1990 to 1994 before becoming a visiting scientist with the New Diseases Group at Harvard School of Public Health from 1994 to 2002. Possas also served as National Executive Secretary, National Technical Biosafety Commission (CTNBio), Ministry of Science and Technology, Brazil from 2001 to 2002 and Head, Research and Technological Development Unit, National AIDS Program, Ministry of Health, Brazil, 2002–2011.

She has given radio and television interviews on AIDS, Dengue fever, and Zika fever.

== Awards and distinctions ==
- 1983. FINEP research grant on Health System Evaluation, coordinating 7 subprojects, Medical School, PUC-Campinas, SP
- 1989. FINEP (Financiadora de Estudos e Projetos) grant, Coordinator National Multicentric Project Evaluation Health Systems, FIOCRUZ, RJ
- 1991. Capes Fellowship, Harvard University
- 1992. Takemi Fellow, Harvard University.
- 1993. CNPq Scientific Productivity Fellowship

== Selected publications ==
- Possas, Cristina; Marques, Ernesto T. A.; Risi, João Baptista; Homma, Akira (December 2021). "COVID-19 and Future Disease X in Circular Economy Transition: Redesigning Pandemic Preparedness to Prevent a Global Disaster". Circular Economy and Sustainability. 1 (4): 1463–1478. Bibcode:2021CirES...1.1463P. doi:10.1007/s43615-021-00060-x. ISSN 2730-597X. PMC 8238518. PMID 34888566.
- Possas, Cristina; de Souza Antunes, Adelaide Maria; de Oliveira, Alessandra Moreira; de Souza Mendes Santos, Cristina d'Urso; Ramos, Mateus Pinheiro; de Oliveira Rodrigues Schumacher, Suzanne; Homma, Akira (December 2021). "Vaccine Innovation for Pandemic Preparedness: Patent Landscape, Global Sustainability, and Circular Bioeconomy in Post-COVID-19 era". Circular Economy and Sustainability. 1 (4): 1439–1461. Bibcode:2021CirES...1.1439P. doi:10.1007/s43615-021-00051-y. ISSN 2730-597X. PMC 8280571. PMID 34888570.
- Homma, Akira; Freire, Marcos da Silva; Possas, Cristina (2020). "Vaccines for neglected and emerging diseases in Brazil by 2030: the "valley of death" and opportunities for RD&I in Vaccinology 4.0". Cadernos de Saúde Pública. 36 (suppl 2) e00128819. doi:10.1590/0102-311x00128819. ISSN 1678-4464. PMID 33111747. S2CID 225098917.
- Possas, Cristina; Antunes, Adelaide Maria de Souza; Lins Mendes, Flavia Maria; Veloso, Valdiléa; Martins, Reinaldo Menezes; Homma, Akira (2018-07-03). "HIV cure: global overview of bNAbs' patents and related scientific publications". Expert Opinion on Therapeutic Patents. 28 (7): 551–560. doi:10.1080/13543776.2018.1495708. ISSN 1354-3776. PMID 29962249. S2CID 49650464.
- Possas, C. 1989. Epidemiologia e Sociedade: Heterogeneidade Estrutural e Saúde no Brasil [Epidemiology and Society: Structural Heterogeneity and Health in Brazil. Hucitec, São Paulo.
- Possas, C. 1980. Saúde e Trabalho: a Crise da Previdência Social [Health and Labour: the crisis of Social Welfare in Brazil], [2nd edition in 1989]. Hucitec. [Winner award of honors from the Brazilian Society of Social Welfare Rights in 1981 for the best book on Social Welfare].
- Levins, Richard; Awerbuch, Tamara; Brinkmann, Uwe; Eckardt, Irina; Epstein, Paul; Makhoul, Najwa; de Possas, Cristina Albuquerque; Puccia, Charles; Spielman, Andrew; Wilson, Mary E. (1994). "The Emergence of New Diseases". American Scientist. 82 (1): 52–60. Bibcode:1994AmSci..82...52L. ISSN 0003-0996. JSTOR 29775101.
- Possas, Cristina; Lourenço-de-Oliveira, Ricardo; Tauil, Pedro Luiz; Pinheiro, Francisco de Paula; Pissinatti, Alcides; Cunha, Rivaldo Venâncio da; Freire, Marcos; Martins, Reinaldo Menezes; Homma, Akira (2018-09-03). "Yellow fever outbreak in Brazil: the puzzle of rapid viral spread and challenges for immunisation". Memórias do Instituto Oswaldo Cruz. 113 (10) e180278. doi:10.1590/0074-02760180278. ISSN 0074-0276. PMC 6135548. PMID 30427974.
