= Tamara Awerbuch-Friedlander =

Israeli-American biomathematician and public health scientist (1941–2021)

Tamara Eugenia Awerbuch-Friedlander
- תמרה אוורבוך-פרידלנדר
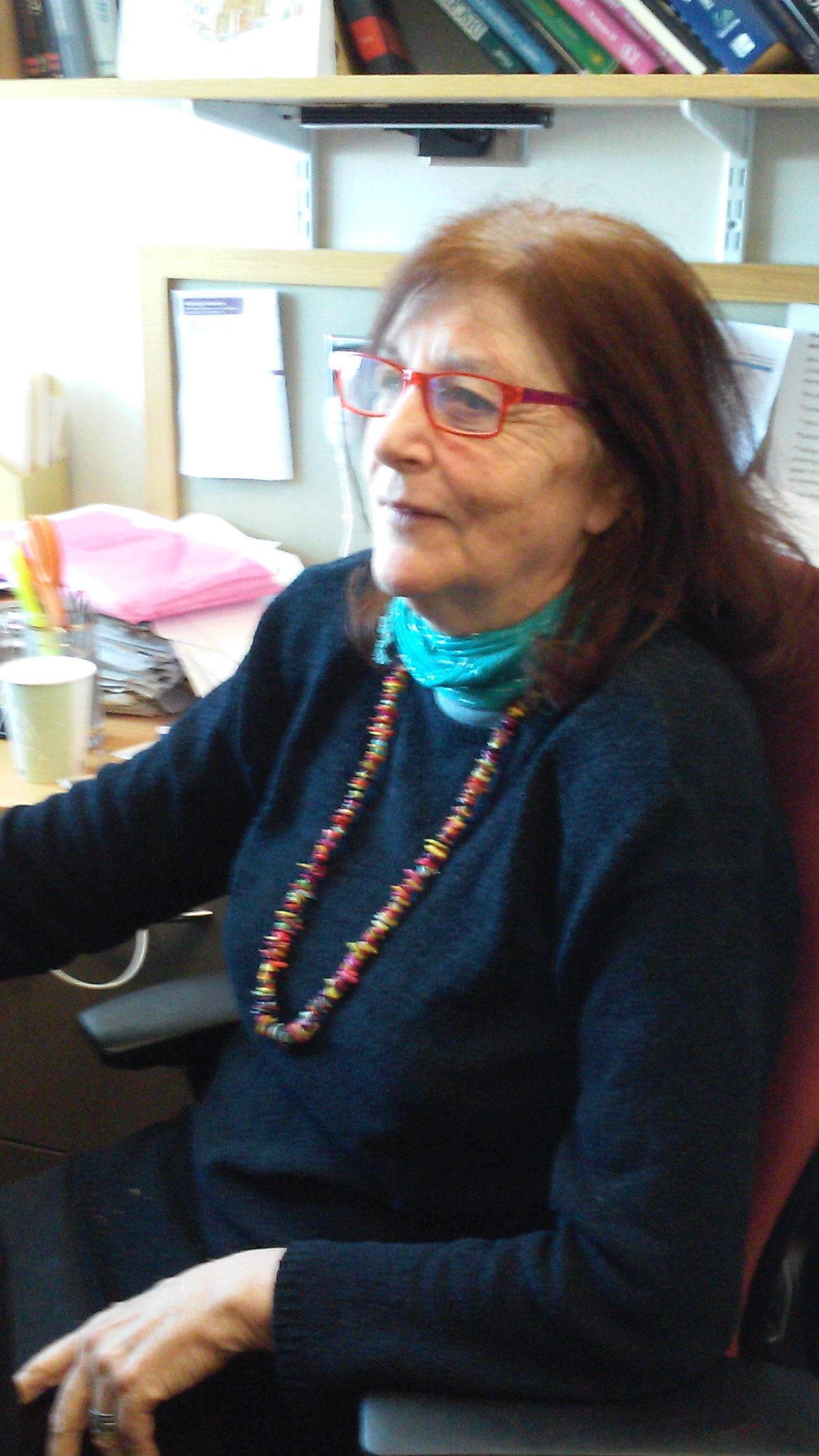
- Born: Tamara Eugenia Friedlander; June 25, 1941; Uruguay
- Died: October 15, 2021 (aged 80); Tel Aviv, Israel
- Citizenship: United States
- Education: Hebrew University, Israel; Massachusetts Institute of Technology, 1979
- Occupations: Biomathematician, Public Health Researcher, professor
- Children: 2 sons
- Relatives: Chaya Clara (Goldman) and Michael Friedlander
- Writing career
- Period: 20th and 21st centuries
- Genres: biomathematics, Biostatistics, statistics, public health, biomathematics, emergent diseases, Epidemiology, HIV/AIDS
- Subjects: Biostatistics, statistics, public health, biomathematics, disease vectors, entomology
- Notable work: The Truth is the Whole: Essays in Honor of Richard Levins Paperback (1 September 2018)
- Notable awards: Fulbright Scholarship (mathematical epidemiology), Robert Wood Johnson Foundation Investigator Award
- Literary movement: Women's health, feminism, university women

Tamara Eugenia Awerbuch-Friedlander (Hebrew: תמרה אוורבוך-פרידלנדר; 1941–2021) was an Uruguay-born Israeli-American biomathematician and public health scientist who worked at the Harvard School of Public Health (HSPH) in Boston, Massachusetts. Her primary research and publications focus on biosocial interactions that cause or contribute to disease. She also is believed to be the first female Harvard faculty member to have had a jury trial for a lawsuit filed against Harvard University for sex discrimination.

== Early life ==
Tamara Eugenia Friedlander was born in Uruguay, lived until the age of 12 in Buenos Aires, Argentina, then moved to Israel with her parents, where her grandparents and parents had lived after they had escaped Nazi Germany just before the Holocaust began. She studied and completed two degrees at Hebrew University in Jerusalem. She studied chemistry and minored in biochemistry and completed the BSc degree in 1965.

In 1967, she completed both the Master of Science (MSc) in Physiology and the Master of Education (MEd) degree from Hebrew University. She was certified to teach grades K–12 in Israel, where she lectured and appeared on panels and in workshops, as she did also in the United States and elsewhere. She also served for two years in the Israeli Army.

In October 1973, while visiting friends in America, she was offered employment at MIT in Cambridge, Massachusetts, to study chemical carcinogens in tissue cultures, then a recently developed technique. During this period, she worked in the lab studying carcinogenicity in tissue cultures, studied one course each semester, and lived frugally, sharing a house with MIT junior Faculty and graduate students. As one of her allotted courses per semester, in spring of 1974 she first started to study mathematics, taking mathematics and statistics. In summer 1975, she matriculated as a full-time student at MIT, where in 1979 she completed her doctorate in Nutrition and Food Science.

She became a United States citizen and had resided in the United States until her eventual relocation to Tel Aviv in the 2010s. She was recruited in 1983 to the Biostatistics Department of the Harvard T.H. Chan School of Public Health by Department Chair Marvin Zelen. She was a Fulbright scholar in 1988. In 1993, she began a long career in the Department of Global Health and Population at the Harvard T.H. Chan School of Public Health.

== Education ==
- Undergraduate study at Hebrew University in Israel.
  - BSc in Chemistry (minor in biochemistry) – 1965
  - MSc in Physiology – 1967
  - MEd – Education (certified to teach K–12) – 1967
- PhD, MIT, Department of Nutrition and Food Science, Major in Metabolism, 1979
  - Thesis: "A diffusion bioassay for the quantitative determination of mutagenicity of chemical carcinogens" (a theoretical study for determining safe threshold concentrations of food additives re: carcinogenesis)
- Postdoc, MIT, in Somatic Cell Genetics 1979–1981

== Career ==
Since the early 2000s, she organized and carried out research on conditions that lead to the emergence, maintenance, and spread of epidemics. Her research encompasses sexually-transmitted diseases (STDs) such as HIV/AIDS, as well as vector-borne diseases, such as Lyme disease, dengue, and Zika virus and Zika fever. Awerbuch-Friedlander recently researched the spread and control of rabies based on an eco-historical analysis. Her work is interdisciplinary, and some of her publications are co-authored with international scientists and members of different departments of the HSPH and the Massachusetts Institute of Technology.

Some of her analytical mathematical models led to fundamental epidemiological discoveries, for example, that oscillations are an intrinsic property of tick dynamics. She presented her work in many international conferences and at the Isaac Newton Institute of Mathematical Sciences in Cambridge, England, where she was invited to participate in the Program on Models of Epidemics.

Awerbuch-Friedlander was a founding member of the New and Resurgent Disease Working Group. Within this context, she was involved in organizing a conference in Woods Hole, Massachusetts, on the emergence and resurgence of diseases, where she led the workshop on Mathematical Modeling.

In the late 1990s, Awerbuch-Friedlander was co-investigator in a project, "Why New and Resurgent Diseases Caught Public Health by Surprise and a Strategy to Prevent This" (supported by the Robert Wood Johnson Foundation). At Harvard T.H. Chan School of Public Health, Awerbuch-Friedlander co-chaired the committee on Bio- and Public Health Mathematics. Some of her research papers were the result of collaboration with students through the course Mathematical Models in Biology, which had large portions dedicated to infectious diseases. She was interested in public health education and has developed for high school adolescents educational software based on models for determining the risk that an individual with certain risky sexual behaviors actually would become infected with HIV. These models helped risk-prone youth, parents, educators, community health leaders, and public health researchers explore how changes in sexual behavior impact their probability of contracting HIV.

=== The Truth is the Whole ===
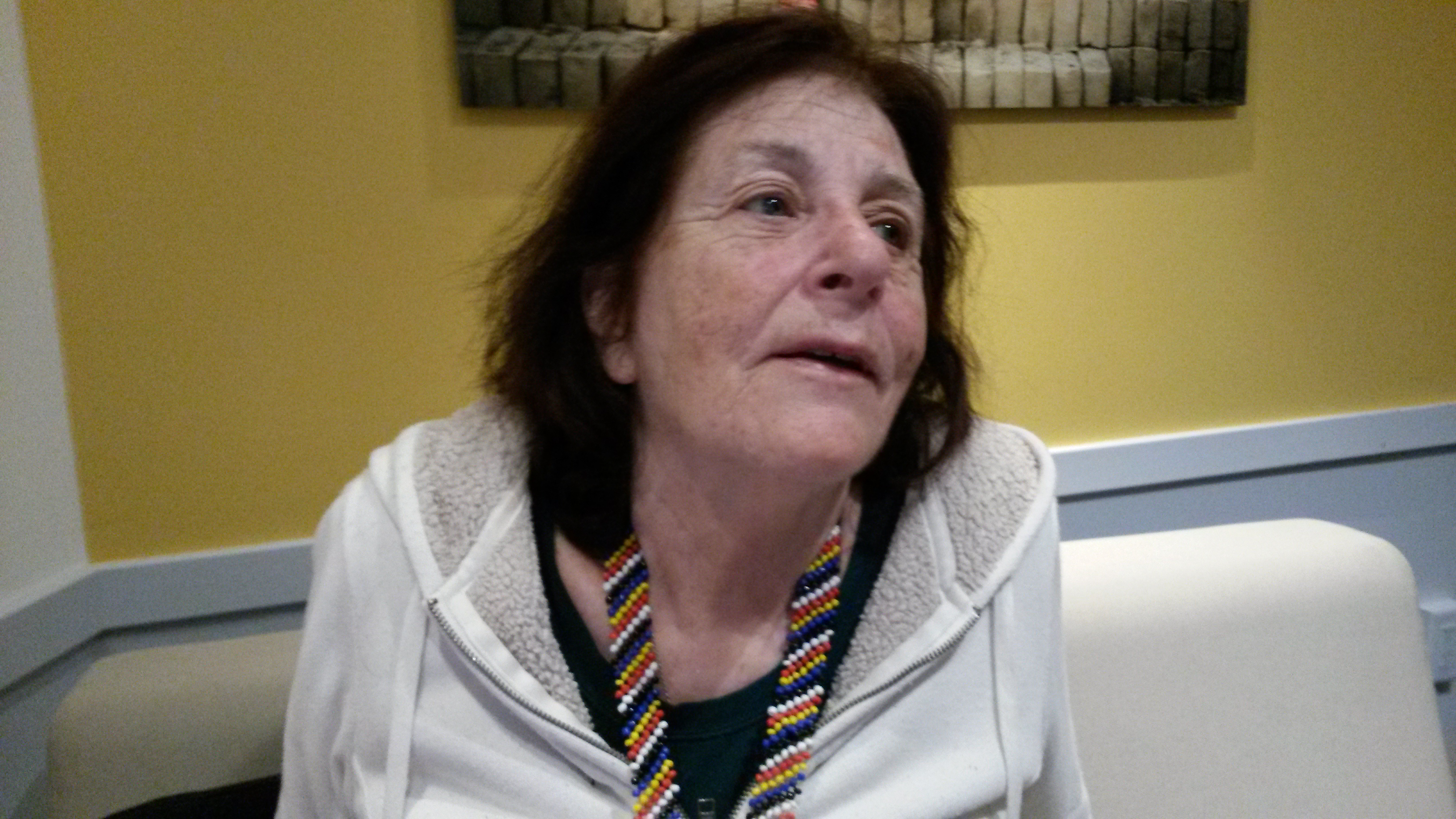
Tamara Awerbuch-Friedlander, 2016

Awerbuch-Friedlander also chaired the planning committee for the 85th birthday celebration of Richard Levins, founder of the Human Ecology program in the Global Health and Population Department of the Harvard School of Public Health, a three-day conference with the Hegelian theme "The Truth is the Whole" held in mid-2015 at the Harvard School of Public Health, focusing on the manifold contributions in models of complexity theory and holistic research from mathematical biologist Levins and his colleagues, students, and disciples, who broadly are interested in complex systems biology. The September 2018 book, The Truth Is the Whole: Essays in Honor of Richard Levins (ISBN 0998889105/9780998889108), in which she was co-editor with Maynard Clark and Dr. Peter Taylor, includes parts of the proceedings from over 20 contributors from that Harvard symposium.

=== Sex-discrimination suit against Harvard ===
Although Theda Skocpol had alleged gender bias in denial of tenure as early as 1980, Awerbuch-Friedlander was believed to be the first female Harvard Faculty member to file a lawsuit against Harvard University for sex discrimination. The suit was "filed with the Middlesex County Superior Court in June 1997."

Encouraged by her mentors, Richard Levins and Marvin Zelen, Awerbuch-Friedlander sought "nearly $1 million in lost wages and benefits, as well as a promotion at the HSPH" and argued "that Fineberg refused to promote her to a tenure-track position because she is a woman, despite the positive recommendation of the HSPH's selection committee of appointment and re-appointment (SCARP)." Intermittently from 1998 through 2007, the gender discrimination case was covered by the Harvard Crimson (campus media), The Boston Globe (local media), and Science magazine (professional and scientific print media). Science documented the case developments of the sex-discrimination case in its "News of the Week: Women in Science" section. and in Science's SCIENCESCOPE two months later. Her sex discrimination lawsuit was based upon Harvard's denial of tenure to her, despite her significant accomplishments in her fields of expertise, biomathematics, epidemiology, biostatistics and public health. The University argued that no tenure track positions were open in her new department, after she had been reassigned from one department to another. It has been argued that proving sex discrimination in the sciences is very difficult.

== Notable students ==
- Christl Donnelly and Wendy Leisenring. Worked on the comparison of transmission rates of HIV1 and HIV2 in a cohort of prostitutes in Senegal 1990–1991. Publication: Bulletin of Mathematical Biology 55:731–743, 1993.
- Sandro Galea – Variability and vulnerability at the ecological level: Implications for understanding the social determinants of health. Spring 2000. Appeared in American Journal of Public Health, 92:1768–1772, 2002.

== Death ==
Dr. Awerbuch-Friedlander retired to Tel Aviv, Israel, and died there in 2021. She was buried in the Kiryat Shaul Cemetery in Tel Aviv, Israel.

== See also ==
- Katey Stone
