= J. L. Hubby =

American geneticist

John Lee Hubby (March 19, 1932 – March 28, 1996) was an American geneticist, pioneer of gel electrophoresis, and co-author, with Richard Lewontin, of foundational studies in the field of molecular evolution.

After earning a PhD from the University of Texas at Austin in 1959, Hubby took a postdoctoral fellowship at the University of Chicago, followed by a faculty position there. In the early 1960s, he developed new applications for gel electrophoresis. He applied the technique to identify different versions of the same protein, reflecting different alleles for the same genetic locus, in fruit flies. Hubby collaborated with Lewontin to produce two breakthrough papers in 1966 that used electrophoresis to determine the level of genetic variation in natural populations of Drosophila pseudoobscura. Their studies revealed high levels of heterozygosity relative to the predictions of most evolutionary theorists, and pioneered the study of molecular evolution

He received the Quantrell Award.
