= Bye-Fellow =

Academic position

A Bye-Fellow is a position in academia and post-secondary education at several British and Commonwealth universities for a Fellow who is not a member of the foundation of a college and "may or may not have fewer privileges than a full fellow".

== See also ==
- List of academic ranks
- Academic ranks in the United Kingdom
