= Racial and ethnic misclassification in the United States =

Incorrect perception of another individual's race and/or ethnicity in the U.S.

Racial and ethnic misclassification in the United States is the inaccurate perception of another individual's racial or ethnic background in the context of how 'race' is discussed in American society. Although most often on the basis of phenotype, misclassifications can also be based on judgments about given name or surname, country of origin, dialect or accent, and/or stereotypes about racial/ethnic groups.

Given that race is socially constructed and does not have an underlying biological or genetic origin, a person's race is often determined by their heritage and self-identification as a member of a racial group or groups. The United States census officially recognizes five racial categories: White, Black or African American, Asian, American Indian and Alaska Native, Native Hawaiian and Other Pacific Islander, and Two or More Races. The term 'racial misclassification' is commonly used in academic research on this topic but can also refer to incorrect assumptions of another's ethnicity, without misclassifying race (e.g., a person can be misclassified as Chinese when they are Japanese while still being perceived as Asian). Both race and ethnicity are considered complex and fluid, and one's identification with race/ethnicity may change based on context, life experience, and in response to others. As a result, misclassification occurs when an individual is perceived by an observer as belonging to a racial/ethnic group that does not match their own self-identification and can have negative consequences for wellbeing. This is not to be confused with passing or racial misrepresentation, which are typically conscious efforts on the part of the actor to be perceived as a member of another race/ethnicity.

Certain racial/ethnic identities are more likely to be misclassified in the United States, including Native American, Multiracial, and Latinx. As American demographics become increasingly diverse and the 2020 Census observed historically high rates of multiracial identification, reported rates of mismatch between other-ascribed and self-identified race are likely to increase.

== Background ==
Race has well-documented influences on interpersonal interactions, such as police behavior towards suspects, teachers' behaviors toward their students, and doctors' behaviors towards patients. In order to understand how individuals are treated in social environments, it is not only important to know how individuals self-identify, but also what racial classifications are ascribed to them by others. Indeed, research on mental and physical health disparities and discrimination has found marked differences in the wellbeing and experiences of individuals when only using self-reported race compared to multidimensional measures of race.

=== Perception of race and ethnicity ===
Cognitive and social psychologists have studied how humans come to perceive others as belonging to specific racial/ethnic categories, most often with the goal of understanding how humans apply stereotypes to strangers. Psychologists agree that the human brain is wired to automatically classify people into distinct categories to help the brain make predictions about behavior based on observations about similar people in the past.

While there are different encoding processes for classifying various stimuli, there is no scientific consensus on which encoding system is used to perceive race/ethnicity. Some believe race and ethnicity are encoded by the "living-kinds" scheme, others argue it is by the "social grouping" scheme, and still others assert that race and ethnicity are encoded by a separate scheme evolved for the specific purpose of identifying race/ethnicity.

And while it is not yet clear how race/ethnicity is encoded and perceived, many researchers agree that the perception of race/ethnicity functions as a 'cognitive shortcut' for the human brain to make predictions about others' actions and behavior without extensively observing individuals themselves. This can sometimes lead to erroneous assumptions about others due to broad stereotypes that are not applicable at the individual level, or prejudice against a people group that unfairly results in discrimination against individuals who have done nothing wrong.

Nevertheless, race/ethnicity is often one of the first things humans notice when meeting a new person and judgments about identity are unlikely to change without presentation of new and strong evidence to the contrary. This is partially explained by cognitive inertia, the tendency for our beliefs to resist change, as well as racial essentialism. Racial essentialism is a view that race/ethnicity has an "essence" that is inherited, innate, and unchanging. Despite genetic and biological research attesting that there is no biological basis for race or genetic profile that is common to people with the same racial category, racial essentialism is a common lay theory that promotes rigid ideas about social hierarchies. For this reason, once a judgment about another person's race/ethnicity is made, the observer is very unlikely to consider that their initial judgment could change due to their expectation that race and ethnicity are fixed at birth. Thus, even if their original perception was incorrect, they are unlikely to look for further evidence that could help correct their misclassification because they have assumed that they were correct and that their perception should not change. Although it often feels that humans are accurately experiencing the physical world around them, in reality, perceptions of others are biased by previous experiences and one's own identities.

==== Salient features in race/ethnicity perception ====
Eye tracking technology has allowed researchers to observe what parts of the face that humans look at most when determining the race/ethnicity of a stranger for the first time. Studies show that humans rely of skin texture and look most to the facial regions containing the eyes and nostrils when trying to assess another's race. However, in order to correctly classify human features as being phenotypical for a specific racial/ethnic group, individuals must first have sufficient exposure and knowledge about what members of that particular race/ethnicity look like.

A lack of familiarity with people from that racial/ethnic group will increase the likelihood of making a misclassification error. Hence, computers trained to identify faces often make errors due to a lack of data on some races and an overabundance of data on others. This partially explains why humans tend to misclassify numerically smaller racial/ethnic groups and cross-race people more—they have less exposure to, and therefore less familiarity with, the phenotypical features of those races/ethnicities.

== Who is misclassified? ==
=== Racially ambiguous people ===
There are some facial features or combinations of features that observers find harder to classify as belonging to a group within their existing notions of race. Individuals whom observers find hard to categorize are considered 'racially ambiguous' by outside observers and are often multiracial. Racially ambiguous people are likely to experience repeated misclassification and moreover, are likely to be misperceived as several different races/ethnicities instead of consistently being misclassified as the same, incorrect race/ethnicity. This is particularly the case when observers attempt to identify targets from Asian, Hispanic, American Indian, and Middle Eastern backgrounds, whereas misclassifications of individuals who self-identify as Black or White have more consistent patterns.

There is some research to suggest that ambiguity can lead to more negative social interactions from observers. In one such study, psychologists and neuroscientists found that when White individuals interacted with a racially ambiguous confederate in an experimental study, they were more anxious and cognitively tired, and the confederate perceived more negativity than when the actor was given a racial label. Participants also had a better memory for the physical appearance of the confederate when they were given a label for the confederate's race.

This effect could possibly indicate that when faced with racial ambiguity, observers often misclassify the actor and thus have inaccurate expectations about the social interaction to follow. An alternative explanation is that racial ambiguity may be cognitively taxing, resulting in mental fatigue and less positive interactions. This and other research suggests that racially ambiguous individuals may experience more negative social experiences as well as more stress.

=== Cross-race individuals ===
Rates of misclassification are higher for people who differ from the observer's race (i.e., cross-race individuals), presumably due to less familiarity with faces of other races than with faces of one's same race/ethnicity. This may be explained by the phenomenon of homophily, which is the tendency for individuals to befriend or be in the vicinity of people who are similar to themselves. More specifically, researchers have observed a robust tendency for humans to gravitate towards others of their same race in social spaces. One consequence of this same-race preference is high familiarity within one's own racial/ethnic group, but a low familiarity with others of different races/ethnicities. This results in fewer misclassification errors among members of the same race/ethnicity (e.g., Latinx individuals are more likely to correctly recognize when someone else is Latinx) and more cross-race misclassification.

=== Numerically small racial/ethnic groups ===
Members of numerically smaller racial/ethnic groups are also more likely to be misclassified, whereas members of racial/ethnic majorities are less likely to experience misclassification. In the example of White individuals, who are a numerical majority in the U.S., White features and likeness can be easily observed in spaces where White people are present as well as in media such as television, movies, and advertisements. Accordingly, many Americans are very familiar with phenotypically White features and have a high awareness of White people being present in many spaces, even if they do not come into contact with many White people personally.

On the other hand, smaller racial/ethnic groups are not typically represented in mainstream media or popular culture and they are less likely to be present in the average social space due to their small numerical size. Therefore, when misclassification occurs, it typically occurs in one direction with numerically smaller race/ethnicities being misclassified as members of larger race/ethnicities. For instance, it is more common for Native Americans to be misclassified as White than for White individuals to be misclassified as Native American.

=== Multiracial and multiethnic people ===
Much of the empirical work on racial/ethnic misclassification studies multiracial and multiethnic populations. This is because multiracial individuals are often more racially ambiguous, most multiracial groups are numerically smaller than the monoracial groups of their ancestry, and they are more likely to be cross-race or seen as cross-race by observers. Additionally, multiracial identities contradict existing notions of race/ethnicity which tend to classify people as one single race/ethnicity instead of multiple or a blend of races/ethnicities.

Multiracial self-identification is also complex. Many multiracial people have a collection of race/ethnicity identity options to choose from (e.g., Asian, White, Asian and White, biracial, mixed race, etc.) rather than one clear path of racial identification. Racial/ethnic identification is fluid and different identities may become more or less salient over time or in different contexts, resulting in changes in self-reported race. For example, it is common for biracial individuals to express that they feel less connected to their monoracial heritages when they are with monoracial people from those groups (e.g., not feeling Black enough around monoracial Black people). Economic and social status changes are also correlated with both self-perceived and other-ascribed identity such that upward mobilization (e.g., getting married, receiving a promotion) contributes to perceptions of Whiteness, while downward mobilization (e.g., losing a job) is related to perceptions of being darker skinned.

Multiracial individuals' self-identification may also be influenced by others' perceptions. Historically, the one-drop rule placed restrictions on how biracial Black and White people could identify, legally forcing them to identify as Black in order to deny them of equal rights and fair treatment. Echoes of the one-drop laws are still seen today, as biracial Black and White individuals are more likely to be perceived as Black than White or multiracial when the observer holds anti-egalitarian views. This is a topic that has gained media coverage with many biracial part-Black celebrities and public figures including Kamala Harris, Tiger Woods, and Meghan Markle frequently being labeled as Black rather than their biracial heritage.

== Psychosocial consequences ==
=== Psychological consequences ===
Some researchers argue that more pervasive misclassification has negative psychological effects, while others claim that chronic misclassification allows actors to better predict when they will be misclassified and psychologically adapt. The former claim draws on empirical evidence that routinely being perceived as "looking like" a different race/ethnicity than one's self-identification is associated with psychological distress. On the other hand, it is possible that being inconsistently misclassified rather than chronically misclassified (i.e., sometimes perceived correctly, sometimes incorrectly) could cause even greater stress by signaling that the actor is not "classifiable."

However, proponents on both sides agree that misclassification, regardless of its frequency, causes psychological distress and negatively impacts wellbeing. This is consistent with identity control theory which argues that when cues about observers perceptions of an individual contradict the individual's own identities, they experience stress. Further confirmation of this theory is found in evidence that misclassification is associated with higher rates of depression and considering suicide. Pervasive racial and/or ethnic misclassification is also related to a weaker sense of racial/ethnic identity, which has negative consequences for the self-esteem and self-image of groups that face racism. Mismatches between how individuals feel about themselves and how others see them can even cause individuals to question the accuracy of their self-perceptions and consider changing their identification to match what others expect of them.

=== Social consequences ===
Racial and ethnic misclassification can impact social interactions and social status. One social risk of misclassification is not being fully accepted by racial/ethnic in-group members or being seen as inauthentic. In some cases, this can motivate misclassified individuals to participate in political action on behalf of their racial group or join a race-based organization to signal their in-group solidarity. Additionally, they may also experience discrimination against a racial/ethnic identity or identities they do not hold.

==== How misclassification is communicated ====
Racial and ethnic misclassification may be communicated explicitly by observers (e.g., incorrect statements about the actor's perceived race/ethnicity), or expressed through more subtle interactions (e.g., "is this food authentic?"). One situation that racially ambiguous people often encounter is being asked by others to explain their racial background or to answer the question, "where are you from?" In cases like these, the observer communicates their uncertainty about the actor's race/ethnicity, that the actor seems different from other people whom they presume belong in the space, or that they do not seem "American." Questions about one's race/ethnicity or country of origin may be viewed by some as an opportunity to share their background, while others may refuse to answer them, say they are inappropriate, or challenge the traditional ideas about race that they represent.

Explicit racial/ethnic misclassifications (e.g., "do your parents speak to you in Spanish?") may result in attempts by the actor to correctly communicate their identity through explicit statements such as, "I'm not Hispanic, I'm Native American" or more discrete signals through clothing or cultural references. Although less common, some may also choose to capitalize on their racial ambiguity by misrepresenting their race/ethnicity or passing as a member of another race/ethnicity if it provides economic or social advantages that they would not have otherwise. One example are the historical stories of multiracial individuals assimilating to White culture in order to avoid discrimination and the harsh restrictions of racial segregation in the U.S.

== Mortality and medical records ==
Correct racial identification is necessary to accurately estimate disease prevalence within a population. Because misclassifications are typically directional (i.e., one group is often misclassified as another, but not vice versa), disease rates are also subject to directional effects.

Native Americans are the most common victims of post-mortem misclassification in the United States, with most misidentified individuals being labeled as White. As a result, disease incidence and mortality rates likely appear lower than is accurate for these populations due to error or bias, and such rates may be erroneously interpreted as indications of a healthy population. However, disease prevalence is likely underestimated for a number of conditions, including sexually transmitted infections, cancer, cardiovascular disease, and death. Conversely, disease rates among White individuals are likely inflated due to the directionality of Native American misclassification, but these effects are undoubtedly less extreme in magnitude given the much larger population size of Whites than Native Americans. Many researchers have called attention to this issue as a public health crisis that is not allocated the adequate attention, research, planning and management, public health programs, or funds to prevent and treat disease in Native American populations.

== See also ==
- Cross-race effect
- Essentialism
- Ethnic identity development
- Health disparities
- Homophily
- Passing (racial identity)
- Passing (sociology)
- Multiracial Americans
- Race (human categorization)
- Race and ethnicity in the United States
- Race and ethnicity in the United States census
- Racial classification of Indian Americans
- Racial fluidity
- Racial misrepresentation
