= Ecosocial theory =

Theory of disease spread and distribution

Ecosocial theory, first proposed by name in 1994 by Nancy Krieger of the Harvard T.H. Chan School of Public Health, is a broad and complex theory with the purpose of describing and explaining causal relationships in disease spread and distribution. While it incorporates biological and psychosocial influences on disease occurrence, the theory is also suited to analyze the relationships between social factors and disease development in public health research. The core constructs of ecosocial theory are: Embodiment; pathways to embodiment; the cumulative interplay between exposure, resistance, and susceptibility; and agency and accountability. Further, the theory specifies that all constructs must be considered in concert, as they work together in a synergistic explanation of disease distribution. The theory assumes that distributions of disease are determined at multiple levels and that analyses must incorporate historical, political-economic, temporal, and spatial factors.

== Key constructs ==
The key constructs of ecosocial theory are:

1. Embodiment
2. Pathways to embodiment
3. The cumulative interplay of exposure, susceptibility, and resistance
4. Agency and accountability

All four constructs work together and must be understood to assess the impact of multiple levels of influence on the distribution of disease within populations. "Embodiment" describes the literal physical incorporation of the social and biological world into an individual's body. "Embodiment" is an active process (a verb-like noun), in that the relationship between bodies and the world around them is reciprocal, cyclical, and synergistic. "Pathways to embodiment" describes the various ways that social, biological, and environmental forces may interact with an individual's body in context. Pathways must be explored across various spatio-temporal scales to understand the complex interplays that can occur over history, inter-generationally, across the life course, and at global, national, societal, familial, and molecular levels. "Cumulative interplay" describes how patterns of disease emerge within social, ecological, and biological contexts. It emphasizes how individuals in different socio-economic positions have different exposures, susceptibilities, and resistance (both biological and political) to disease, shaped by unique histories and experiences over the life course, spatio-temporal factors, and interactions with groups, power structures, discrimination, and inequality. "Agency and accountability" argues that the State is a responsible agent in the patterns of disease distribution in a given society. In contrast to biomedical and lifestyle theories of disease distribution, the social system that creates discrimination and inequality is also responsible for disease patterns. Further, Krieger expands this construct to include the accountability that epidemiologists have in identifying and treating health disparities and their obligation to explicitly identify their theoretical lens, as well as to become activists, not just researchers, when faced with injustice.

== History ==
The theory was influenced by the work of proponents of social medicine in the 19th and early 20th centuries, such as Louis-René Villermé, Rudolf Virchow, Friedrich Engels, and Karl Marx; as well as by the more recent work of "social production of disease" (SPD) theorists, including Edgar Sydenstricker, Daniel S. Goldberg, and George Davey Smith. The SPD theory explains how capitalist societies in the 21st century tend to value consumption over production and wealth over the well-being of their citizens. The roots of SPD lie in the research and writings of Villerme, Virchow, and Engels, who discussed the poor working conditions and diseases of working class Europeans around the time of the Industrial Revolution in the late 19th century. In the U.S. in the 1930s, the statistician Sydenstricker examined how poor living and working conditions could cause disease in impoverished populations, and used daily living data to determine proximal biological causes of these population-level disease distributions. Thereafter, both medicine and epidemiology were overtaken by biomedical and lifestyle theories of disease, which explained population-level patterns as mere aggregates of events occurring at the cellular level within individuals. Social factors in epidemiology were largely ignored until Lesley Doyal, Navarro, and others proposed the theories of SPD and the political economy of health in the 1970s, with Krieger later integrating their work into her writings on ecosocial theory. As described by Doyal, SPD consists of the following key constructs: (1) The distribution of disease in a population will pattern along social, economic, and political lines in a given society. (2) The State is at least partly responsible for the health of its citizens. (3) Increases in life expectancy in developed countries have been at the expense of the health of less developed countries. (4) Societies valuing profit, consumption, capitalism, and wealth over the well-being of their people and environments will reflect these priorities in the unequal distribution of disease in people experiencing poverty and disempowered classes.

Ecosocial theory builds on these theories by incorporating biological explanations, a life-course perspective, and a multilevel perspective across space and time to describe associations between exposures and disease, with an explicit focus on inequalities in health status among subjugated groups.

According to ecosocial theory, as influenced by writings on SPD, it is both consumption and production at the societal level that contribute to patterns of disease. The distribution of income, access to healthcare, education, and occupation is not equal in most societies, and often follows power dynamics that repress women, people of color, sexual and gender minorities, and other discriminated-against groups. Patterns of health and disease follow this socio-political ordering and, in part, determine the distribution of disease in societies over time.

== Examples of the application ==
For example, obesity rates are not evenly distributed in the United States. People with lower socio-economic position (SEP) tend to have higher rates of obesity, on average; as do populations of African Americans, some Hispanics, and American Indians. These differential rates by group cannot be explained by genetics or biology alone, as it is obvious that not all people with low SES or from racial/ethnic minority populations are obese, and there is no clear genetic link that could explain the dramatic rise in obesity prevalence seen in the U.S. over the past 30 years. Instead, social factors must be used to explain these disparities.

Taking a historical perspective, we can begin to describe the high rates of obesity seen among African Americans in the so-called "stroke belt" of the Southern U.S. The history of slavery in this region helps in part to explain food culture among African Americans, since high-calorie and high-fat foods were essential to the enslaved ancestors working on plantations. The culture of food created in this setting and transmitted over the centuries still exists today; however, the social and physical environment in which people live has changed dramatically. Rather than spending hours in the hot sun doing physical labor, 21st-century Americans often have jobs that are largely sedentary. Cities and suburbs have developed around automobiles as the major means of transportation rather than walking or biking. And fast food, sugar-sweetened beverages, and television have overtaken many areas and aspects of life. In addition, U.S. government subsidies support corn growers in producing corn syrup, and successful corporations often market food that is easy, convenient, full of fat and calories, and cheap. For African Americans in the South who still suffer from economic discrimination due to this history of racism, non-nutritious foods are often the only affordable options in the food deserts in which they live. At multiple levels of political and social order, then, we see, using ecosocial theory, that history, policy, culture, and the social and built environments drive the inequalities in the distribution of obesity among African Americans today. This places agency and accountability at the structural and socio-historical level, rather than on obese individuals themselves.

Similar analyses can be examined in multiple generations of Hispanic immigrants as they acculturate to the United States, American Indians and their history of abuse and repression in this country, and people of low SEP. Ecosocial theory could also help examine how these social forces and pathways become embodied and incorporated into the physiological outcome of obesity over the lifecourse, for example by looking at dietary patterns during pregnancy and how this affects risk of obesity to the fetus as it ages and grows into an adult with an altered metabolism from early exposure.
