= Racial fluidity =

Racial fluidity is the idea that race is not permanent and fixed, but rather imprecise and variable. The interpretation of someone's race, including their self-identification and identification by others, can change over the course of a lifetime, including in response to social situations. The racial identity of groups can change over time as well.

== Applications and examples ==
=== Latin America ===
The conception of racial identity has been historically fluid in Latin America, especially during the colonial period. Racial classification still varies among countries, and is mostly based on the appearance of skin color without regard to one's ancestry. In the Dominican Republic, about half of those with the darkest skin color self-identify as Black, compared to 90% in Panama. There is a high usage of self-identification terms like pardo, mulato, indio, moreno, and mestizo for those with dark skin color. Mulato is considered a particularly fluid designation, used by people of all skin colors.

Social status impacts how people self-identify, with more wealthy people in Brazil self-identifying as White, regardless of actual skin color. The wealthier an individual is, the more likely they are to self-identify as White. In Colombia, Panama, and the Dominican Republic, researchers did not discover a link between wealth and racial identity. Education plays a role in self-identification, with the highly educated in the Dominican Republic more likely to identify as Black. The role of age is variable; older respondents in Brazil were more likely to self-identify as White, compared to older respondents in Dominican Republic who were more likely to self-identify as Black. Even the skin color of the interviewer was noted to have an effect on identification. Brazilians and Colombians were more likely to self-identify as "darker" racial categories when talking to a darker interviewer, whereas Panamanians and Dominicans were more likely to "whiten" their responses while being surveyed by a darker interviewer.

A person's gender also influences their self-identification. Researchers speculated that racial boundaries were more porous for men than for women. Brazilian men were about 25% more likely than Brazilian women to self-identify as White.

=== United States ===
Racial fluidity can apply to both groups of people and individuals, including how individuals self-identify and how they are perceived by others. The availability and use of racial fluidity is generally limited to three circumstances in the US: a small number of Americans with mixed ancestries, including those who identify as Native American, Hispanic, or biracial; changes in social hierarchies that resulted in the "whitening" of previously nonwhite groups; people from highly racially heterogeneous countries, such as Brazil.

==== Individuals ====
On the individual level, racial fluidity is particularly applicable to those with mixed racial heritage, particularly, in the US, of White and another race. A person could present as white in socially advantageous circumstances, such interacting with law enforcement or applying for an apartment. Conversely, they could use their non-white identity in the limited situations where it is more valuable, such as applying to college scholarships. Racial self-identification tends to be very stable in the US, with the most stability seen in White and Black people, and variation in identification seen in Hispanic and multiracial people. On an individual level, people most frequently self-identify the same race or ethnicity on the US census, with 6% of participants changing their responses from 2000 to 2010. Native Americans had the highest level of fluidity; of the 3.3 million who listed Native American ethnicity in the 2000 and 2010 censuses, only one third listed the same ethnicity for both. Self-identification of race may be situational, with immigrants from the Dominican Republic much more likely to self-identify as black while in the US than while in the Dominican Republic. Research on the effect of genealogical DNA tests on racial self-identification has found, rather than embracing the full report, test recipients select a few aspects of their background to embrace based on favored identities or socially accepted ones.

Racial identity as perceived by others is also subject to change over time. The perception of whiteness by others is increased when someone gets married or increases their social standing. Perception of blackness by others is increased when someone loses employment or otherwise loses social standing. The political beliefs of the observer also influence their perceptions. When viewing a racially ambiguous face, White conservatives are more likely than White liberals to apply the one-drop rule and categorize the face as "Black".

==== Groups ====
Historically, in the US, Jewish, Italian, and Irish people were once considered non-white, though as "whiteness" is not rigidly defined, these groups "became" White over time by seeking to distance themselves from Black Americans. Once considered White, Italian and Irish immigrants were less likely to experience harassment and discrimination.
