= Altenberg Workshops in Theoretical Biology =

Expert meetings held in Austria

The Altenberg Workshops in Theoretical Biology are expert meetings focused on a key issue of biological theory, hosted by the Konrad Lorenz Institute for Evolution and Cognition Research (KLI) since 1996. The workshops are organized by leading experts in their field, who invite a group of international top level scientists as participants for a 3-day working meeting in the Lorenz Mansion at Altenberg near Vienna, Austria. By this procedure the KLI intends to generate new conceptual advances and research initiatives in the biosciences, which, due to their explicit interdisciplinary nature, are attractive to a wide variety of scientists from practically all fields of biology and the neighboring disciplines.

== Workshops and their topics ==
- The Ground Floor of Cognition: From Microbes to Animals and Plants. Organized by Pamela Lyon and Fred Keijzer. June 2018
- Cultural Niche Construction. Organized by Kevin Laland and Mike O´Brien. September 2011
- Strategic Interaction in Humans and Other Animals. Organized by Simon Huttegger and Brian Skyrms. September 2011
- The Meaning of "Theory" in Biology. Organized by Massimo Pigliucci, Kim Sterelny, and Werner Callebaut. June 2011
- Biological and Physical Constraints on the Evolution of Form in Plants and Animals. Organized by Jeffrey H. Schwartz and Bruno Maresca. September 2010
- Scaffolding in Evolution, Culture, and Cognition. Organized by Linnda Caporael, James Griesemer, and William Wimsatt. July 2010
- Models of Man for Evolutionary Economics. Organized by Werner Callebaut, Christophe Heintz, and Luigi Marengo. September 2009
- Human EvoDevo: The Role of Development in Human Evolution. Organized by Philipp Gunz and Philipp Mitteroecker. September 2009
- Origins of EvoDevo - A tribute to Pere Alberch. Organized by Gerd B. Müller and Diego Rasskin-Gutman. September 2008
- Measuring Biology - Quantitative Methods: Past and Future. Organized by Fred L. Bookstein and Katrin Schäfer. September 2008
- Toward an Extended Evolutionary Synthesis Organized by Massimo Pigliucci and Gerd B. Müller. July 2008
- Innovation in Cultural Systems - Contributions from Evolutionary Anthropology. Organized by Michael J. O´Brien and Stephen J. Shennan. September 2007
- The Major Transitions Revisited. Organized by Brett Calcott and Kim Sterelny. July 2007
- Comparative Philosophy of Technical Artifacts and Biological Organisms. Organized by Ulrich Krohs and Peter Kroes. September 2006
- The New Cognitive Sciences - Bringing Evolution and Development to Bear on Mind and Brain. Organized by Lynn Nadel, Mary Peterson, and Luca Tommasi. June 2006
- Arriving at a Theoretical Biology - The Waddington Centennial. Organized by Manfred Laubichler and Brian K. Hall. September 2005
- The Evolution of Communicative Creativity - From Fixed Signals to Contextual Flexibility. Organized by D. Kimbrough Oller and Ulrike Griebel. July 2005
- Analog Communication - Evolution, Brain Mechanisms, Dynamics, Simulation. Organized by Karl Grammer and Astrid Juette. September 2004
- Modeling Biology - Structures, Behavior, Evolution. Organized by Luciano da Fontoura Costa and Gerd B. Müller. July 2004
- Viennese Roots of Theoretical Biology - The Vivarium Centenary. Organized by Manfred Laubichler, Gerd B. Müller, and Werner Callebaut. September 2002
- Biological Information Beyond Metaphor. Organized by Werner Callebaut. July 2002
- Evolution of Communication Systems. Organized by D. Kimbrough Oller and Ulrike Griebel. October 2001
- Environment, Development, and Evolution. Organized by Brian Hall, Roy Pearson, and Gerd B. Müller. July 2001
- Modularity - Understanding the Development and Evolution of Complex Natural Systems. Organized by Werner Callebaut and Diego Rasskin-Guttman. October 2000
- Origins of Organismal Form - Beyond the Gene Paradigm Organized by Gerd B. Müller and Stuart Newman. October 1999
- Evolution of Cognition. Organized by Cecilia Heyes, Ludwig Huber, and Adolf Heschl. August 1998
- Evolutionary Naturalism - Bioepistemology and the Challenge of Development and Sociality. Organized by Werner Callebaut and Karola Stotz. June 1997
- The Emergence and Evolution of Organization. Organized by Walter Fontana, Gerd B. Müller and Günter Wagner. September 1996
