= Origination of Organismal Form =

2003 biology anthology edited by Gerd Müller and Stuart A. Newman

- Editors: Gerd B. Müller and Stuart A. Newman
- Series: Vienna Series in Theoretical Biology
- Publisher: MIT Press
- Publication date: 2003
- ISBN: 0-262-13419-5

Origination of Organismal Form: Beyond the Gene in Developmental and Evolutionary Biology is an anthology published in 2003 edited by Gerd B. Müller and Stuart A. Newman. The book is the outcome of the 4th Altenberg Workshop in Theoretical Biology on "Origins of Organismal Form: Beyond the Gene Paradigm", hosted in 1999 at the Konrad Lorenz Institute for Evolution and Cognition Research. It has been cited over 200 times and has a major influence on extended evolutionary synthesis research.

== Description of the book ==
The book explores the multiple factors that may have been responsible for the origination of biological form in multicellular life. These biological forms include limbs, segmented structures, and different body symmetries.

It explores why the basic body plans of nearly all multicellular life arose in the relatively short time span of the Cambrian Explosion. The authors focus on physical factors (structuralism) other than changes in an organism's genome that may have caused multicellular life to form new structures. These physical factors include differential adhesion of cells and feedback oscillations between cells.

The book also presents recent experimental results that examine how the same embryonic tissues or tumor cells can be coaxed into forming dramatically different structures under different environmental conditions.

One of the goals of the book is to stimulate research that may lead to a more comprehensive theory of evolution. It is frequently cited as foundational to the development of the extended evolutionary synthesis.

== List of contributions ==
1. Origination of Organismal Form: The Forgotten Cause in Evolutionary Theory, Gerd B. Müller and Stuart A. Newman
2. The Cambrian "Explosion" of Metazoans, Simon Conway Morris
3. Convergence and Homoplasy in the Evolution of Organismal Form, Pat Willmer
4. Homology:The Evolution of Morphological Organization, Gerd B. Müller
5. Only Details Determine, Roy J. Britten
6. The Reactive Genome, Scott F. Gilbert
7. Tissue Specificity: Structural Cues Allow Diverse Phenotypes from a Constant Genotype, Mina J. Bissell, I. Saira Mian, Derek Radisky and Eva Turley
8. Genes, Cell Behavior, and the Evolution of Form, Ellen Larsen
9. Cell Adhesive Interactions and Tissue Self-Organization, Malcolm Steinberg
10. Gradients, Diffusion, and Genes in Pattern Formation, H. Frederik Nijhout
11. A Biochemical Oscillator Linked to Vertebrate Segmentation, Olivier Pourquié
12. Organization through Intra-Inter Dynamics, Kunihiko Kaneko
13. From Physics to Development: The Evolution of Morphogenetic Mechanisms, Stuart A. Newman
14. Phenotypic Plasticity and Evolution by Genetic Assimilation, Vidyanand Nanjundiah
15. Genetic and Epigenetic Factors in the Origin of the Tetrapod Limb, Günter P. Wagner and Chi-hua Chiu
16. Epigenesis and Evolution of Brains: From Embryonic Divisions to Functional Systems, Georg F. Striedter
17. Boundary Constraints for the Emergence of Form, Diego Rasskin-Gutman
