= D. Kimbrough Oller =

American language scientist

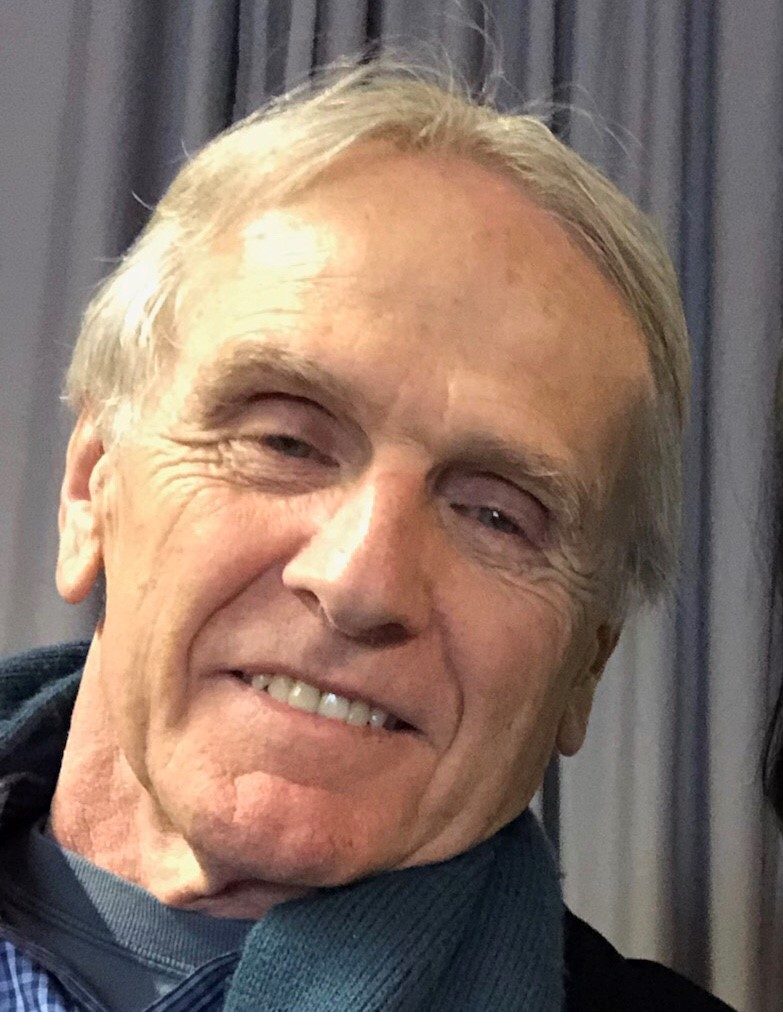
D. Kimbrough Oller
- Born: March 31, 1946; Las Vegas, New Mexico, USA
- Education: University of California at Berkeley (BA, 1968), University of Texas at Austin (PhD, 1971)
- Scientific career
- Fields: origin of language phonological development psycholinguistics evolution of language bilingualism speech and language pathology

D. Kimbrough Oller (born March 31, 1946), also known as Kim Oller, is an American scientist who has contributed to the fields of the evolution of language, child phonology, speech-language pathology (focusing on vocal patterns in cases of infant and childhood hearing loss, Down syndrome, and autism), and to the fields of bilingualism and second-language acquisition. He is currently Professor and Plough Chair of Excellence at the University of Memphis, where he directs the Origin of Language Laboratories. He is also an external faculty member of the Konrad Lorenz Institute for Evolution and Cognition Research (Klosterneuburg, Austria) and a permanent member of the Scientific Advisory Board of the LENA Foundation of Boulder, Colorado. Oller was elected as a Fellow of the American Speech–Language–Hearing Association (ASHA) in 2004 and was granted the Honors of ASHA in 2013. In 2022 he was elected as a Lifetime Fellow of the American Association for the Advancement of Science (AAAS).

== Foundations of Language ==
Oller's theoretical work has focused heavily on illuminating the origin of language by taking account of the foundational characteristics of language seen in human infant vocal development in the first year of life. The corresponding empirical work has described vocal development in human infants and has drawn comparisons with research on vocal communication in non-human primates. This work emphasizes that thus far there has been no demonstration in other apes of the extensive production of exploratory vocalization such as that seen in human infants, nor of the extensive vocal interactions that occur between human infants and their caregivers. Along with his colleague Ulrike Griebel, Oller has proposed a "fitness signaling theory" for the origin of human volubility and vocal flexibility, based on the idea that human infants are, and ancient hominin infants were more altricial than their ape relatives and consequently have been under selection pressure to use voluntary vocalization produced in comfort as an indicator of wellness, presumably promoting investment from caregivers. The fitness signalling idea has also been independently proposed by John L. Locke.

== Early Vocal Development ==
Oller's seminal work on the development of babbling in the human infant helped establish a stage model of vocal development, This work provided definitions for protophones, non-cry sounds that are produced from the first day of life and are precursors to speech. In this model, pre-linguistic babbling develops through the first months until by the second half year canonical babbling begins, with its characteristic reduplicated forms such as “baba” and ‘’dada”, the point at which infants have the capacity to produce sounds that can serve as words (Oller, D. K., 2000). Oller and his colleagues' work has shown that the human infant is both an active explorer of vocalization and an interactor in vocal exchanges. Their research has contributed to the understanding of the importance of babbling and how problems or delays with it may be signs of later speech and language disorders.

== Multilingualism ==
Oller and his colleagues have studied early Spanish-English bilingualism in Miami, FL and in Memphis, TN. Their work has highlighted the “distributed characteristic” of bilingual vocabularies, where some words tend to be distributed between the two languages rather than having translation equivalents occurring in both. As a result, bilingual vocabularies often appear relatively small in both languages compared with monolingual vocabularies of age-matched children. Especially in collaboration with Barbara Z. Pearson, the research introduced the construct of “conceptual scoring” to assess bilingual vocabularies: that is, counting all the word meanings that a child knows in either language, an adjustment that tends to yield equivalent vocabulary sizes for age-matched monolingual children and bilinguals in Spanish and English. A study of 1000 bilingual and monolingual school children in Miami carefully matched for socio-economic status, language of the home, and language of the school illustrated that two-way bilingual education in English and Spanish (half the school day having subject matter taught in each language) from Kindergarten through 5th grade tends to yield little if any deficit in English language performance, while helping to maintain the Spanish language.

In 2011, one of Oller's scientific research articles was recognized by Autism Speaks as one of the top ten achievements in autism.
