= Vienna Series in Theoretical Biology =

Book series published by MIT Press

The Vienna Series in Theoretical Biology is a book series published by MIT Press and devoted to advances in theoretical biology at large. By promoting the formulation and discussion of new theoretical concepts, the series intends to help fill the gaps in our understanding of some of the major open questions of biology, such as the origin and organization of organismal form, the relationship between development and evolution, and the biological bases of cognition and mind.

The Vienna Series grew out of the Altenberg Workshops in Theoretical Biology organized by the Konrad Lorenz Institute for Evolution and Cognition Research (KLI), an international center for advanced study in Altenberg, near Vienna, Austria. The KLI fosters research projects, workshops, archives, book projects, and the journal Biological Theory, all devoted to aspects of theoretical biology, with an emphasis on integrating the developmental, evolutionary, and cognitive sciences.

== Series Editors ==
Gerd B. Müller, Katrin Schäfer, and Thomas Pradeu

Previously: Gerd B. Müller, Günter Wagner, Werner Callebaut

== Volumes ==
- Towards a Biosemiotic Theoretical Biology: Sign Processes and Meaning-Making in Living Systems. Kalevi Kull and Donald Favareau (Eds.), 2026.
- Evolution "On Purpose": Teleonomy in Living Systems. Peter A. Corning, Stuart A. Kauffman, Denis Noble, James A. Shapiro, Richard I. Vane-Wright and Addy Pross (Eds.) 2023.
- Cognitive Biology. Evolutionary and Developmental Perspectives on Mind, Brain, and Behavior. Luca Tommasi, Mary A. Peterson and Lynn Nadel (Eds.), 2009.
- Functions in Biological and Artificial Worlds. Comparative Philosophical Perspectives. Ulrich Krohs and Peter Kroes (Eds.), 2009.
- Evolution of Communicative Flexibility. Complexity, Creativity, and Adaptability in Human and Animal Communication. D. Kimbrough Oller and Ulrike Griebel (Eds.), 2008.
- Modeling Biology. Structures, Behaviors, Evolution. Manfred D. Laubichler and Gerd B. Müller (Eds.), 2007.
- Biological Emergences. Evolution by Natural Experiment. Robert G. B. Reid, 2007.
- Compositional Evolution. The Impact of Sex, Symbiosis, and Modularity on the Gradualist Framework of Evolution. Richard A. Watson, 2006.
- Modularity. Understanding the Development and Evolution of Natural Complex Systems. Werner Callebaut and Diego Rasskin-Gutman (Eds.), 2005.
- Evolution of Communication Systems. A Comparative Approach. D. Kimbrough Oller and Ulrike Griebel (Eds.), 2004.
- Environment, Development, and Evolution. Toward a Synthesis. Brian K. Hall, Roy D. Pearson and Gerd B. Müller (Eds.), 2004.
- Origination of Organismal Form. Beyond the Gene in Developmental and Evolutionary Biology. Gerd B. Müller and Stuart A. Newman (Eds.), 2003.
- The Evolution of Cognition. Cecilia Heyes and Ludwig Huber (Eds.), 2000.
