= Johannes Fritz =

Austrian biologist

Johannes Fritz (born 1967) is an Austrian biologist and conservationist. He is known for his work in wildlife conservation, especially with northern bald ibises, claiming he has been able to “rewild” 277 ibises in Austria. He is the director of the Waldrapp Team and was involved with the production of BBC's Planet Earth III.

== Personal life ==
Fritz has two sons.

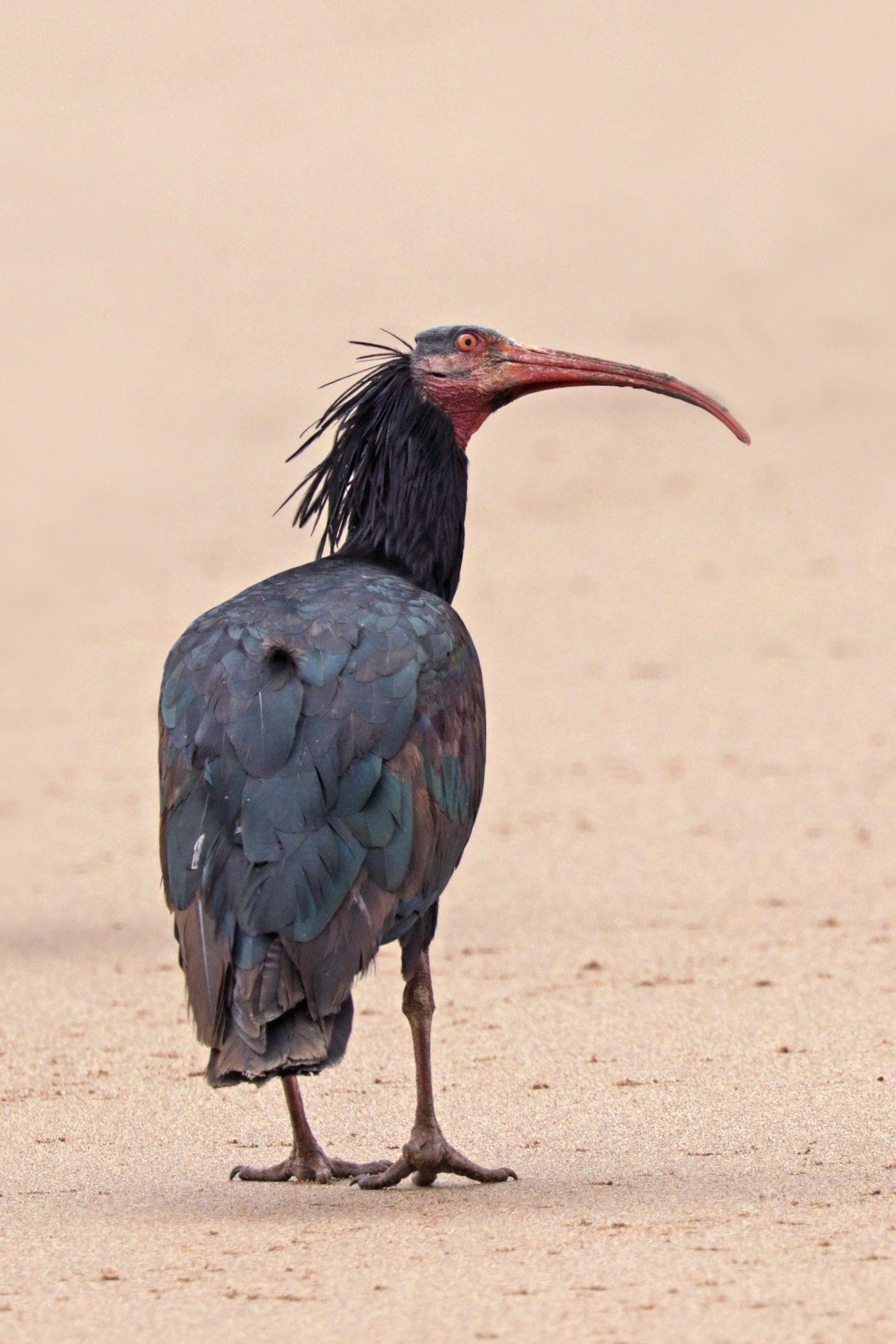
This is a northern bald ibis, also known as a waldrapp.

== Education ==
At 20, Fritz enrolled in a biology program at a university. He worked to monitor groups of chamois and deer. At 24, studies in various Austrian universities and worked at the Konrad Lorenz Forschungsstelle research center.

== Northern bald ibises ==
Since 2004, Fritz's career has centered in the conservation of the northern bald ibis, teaching the birds migration paths from Austria to Italy.
