= Adolf Seilacher =

German paleontologist

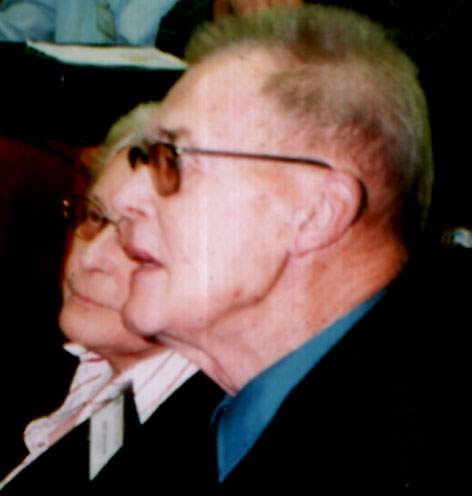
- Born: 15 March 1925
- Died: 26 April 2014 (aged 89)
- Known for: Ichnofacies, Pneu structures
- Awards: Gustav-Steinmann-Medaille (1998)
- Scientific career
- Fields: Paleontology
- Doctoral advisor: Otto Heinrich Schindewolf

Adolf "Dolf" Seilacher (24 February 1925 – 26 April 2014) was a German palaeontologist who worked in evolutionary and ecological palaeobiology for over 60 years. He is best known for his contributions to the study of trace fossils; constructional morphology and structuralism; biostratinomy, Lagerstätten and the Ediacaran biota.

== Career ==
Seilacher worked for his doctorate under Otto Heinrich Schindewolf, at the University of Tübingen. He was also influenced by local palaeontologist Otto Linck. He served in World War II and resumed his studies at Tübingen, corresponding with the French ichnologist, Jacques Lessertisseur. Gaining his doctorate in 1951 on trace fossils, Seilacher moved to the University of Frankfurt (1957) and then the University of Baghdad before taking up a chair in palaeontology in Göttingen. He returned to Tübingen in 1964 as the successor to Schindewolf. After 1987 he held an Adjunct Professorship at Yale University.

== Significant work ==
Seilacher's publications are numerous (well over 200) and cover a range of topics. His studies on trace fossils are perhaps his best-known contributions, especially his 1967 work on the bathymetry of trace fossils. Here he established the concept of ichnofacies: distinctive assemblages of trace fossils controlled largely by depth. This characterisation was later expanded to include the influences of substrate, oxygen, salinity and so on. In addition, he analysed many trace fossils in terms of the behaviour they represent, leading to such work as early computer simulation of trace fossil morphology (with David Raup, in 1969). Much of this work is summarized together with new material in Trace Fossil Analysis (2007).

In 1970 he announced his programme of "Konstruktions-Morphologie" where he stressed the importance of three factors in determining the form of organisms: ecological/adaptive aspects; historical/phylogenetic aspects; and architectural/constructional aspects. The latter two factors are important sources of biological constraints; both acknowledging that both history and constructional principles place limits on what may be achieved in at least the short term of evolution. Such a view was influential on later workers such as Stephen Jay Gould and Richard Lewontin, such as their famous paper on "spandrels" that criticized panadaptionist accounts of evolution and form.

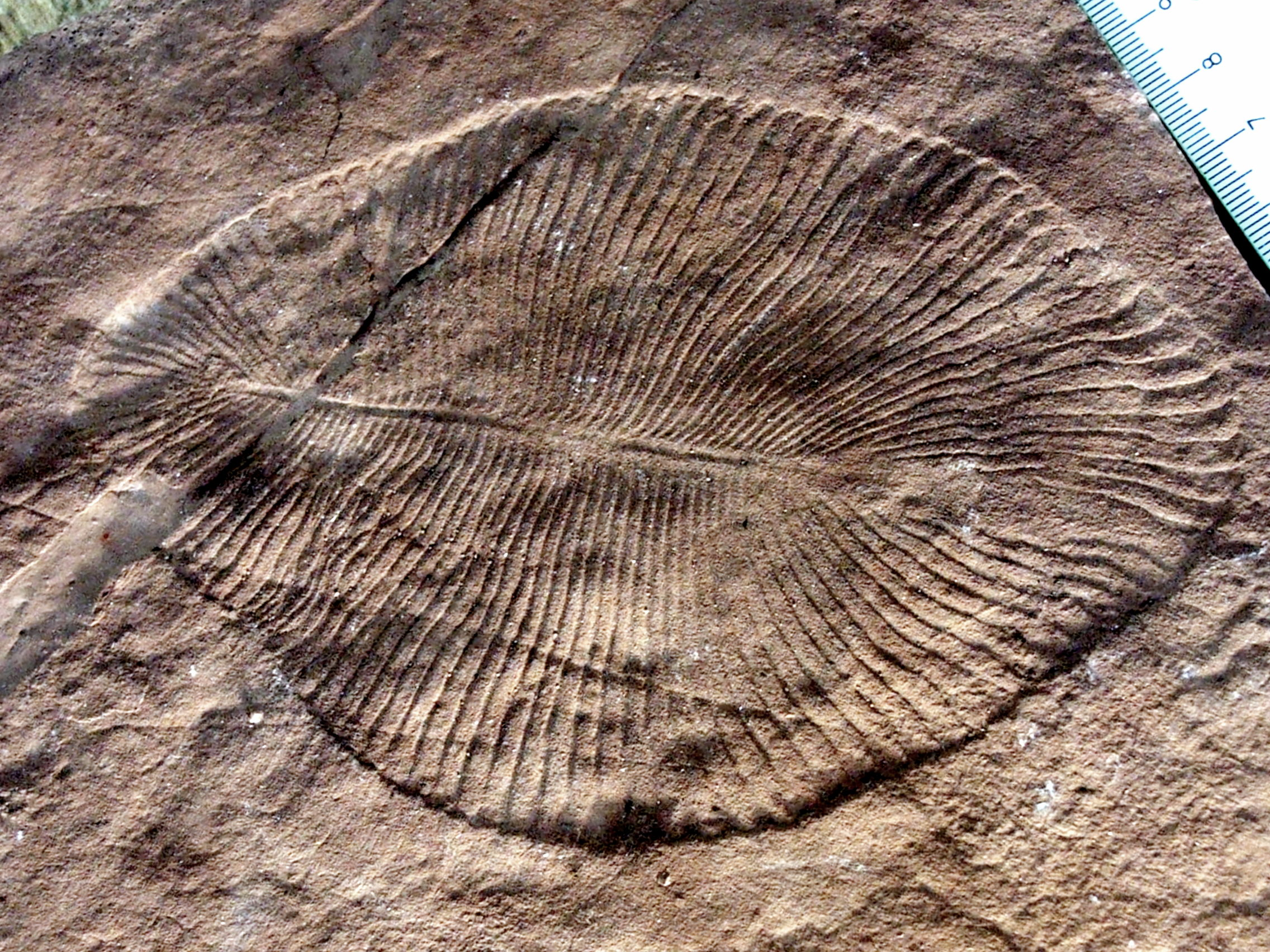
Dickinsonia fossil described as a "pneu" structure with chambers inflated like a quilted air mattress

Seilacher's interest in pattern formation led him to espouse self-organisation models for the origin of certain types of form, the most famous of which are pneu structures. These are fluid-filled structures under tension whose form is broadly determined by the need to distribute the tension across the surface. Seilacher may thus be squarely considered to be a structuralist.

Seilacher coined the term Lagerstätten (meaning a sedimentary deposit that exhibits extraordinary fossils with exceptional preservation and/or concentration). One of his 1985 papers on Lagerstätten proposed a scheme for their classification that went on to become widely accepted. Much of his work has been concerned with preservation and taphonomy in general.

His most controversial contributions were in his work on the Ediacaran assemblages, which he and Friedrich Pflüger (1994) suggested, based on their constructional morphology, to be pneu structures unrelated to modern metazoans. While this view has been steadily opposed by many workers, it gained some ground as the affinities of many of these organisms have remained resistant to analysis. Seilacher considered many of these taxa to be giant xenophyophores, i.e. large rhizopodal protists. He appeared in the film Volcanoes of the Deep Sea, going on a dive on the DSV Alvin to investigate modern analogues of the trace fossil Paleodictyon.

== Awards ==
- 1983 Raymond C. Moore Medal for Paleontology
- 1992 Crafoord Prize
- 1993 Paleontological Society Medal
- 1994 Gustav-Steinmann-Medaille
- 2006 Lapworth Medal of the Palaeontological Association .
- 2013 Otto Jaekel Medaille
