= Spandrel (biology) =

Evolutionary byproduct of some other characteristic

In evolutionary biology, a spandrel is a phenotypic trait that is a byproduct of the evolution of some other characteristic, rather than a direct product of adaptive selection. Stephen Jay Gould and Richard Lewontin brought the term into biology in their 1979 paper "The Spandrels of San Marco and the Panglossian Paradigm: A Critique of the Adaptationist Programme". Adaptationism is a point of view that sees most organismal traits as adaptive products of natural selection. Gould and Lewontin sought to temper what they saw as adaptationist bias by promoting a more structuralist view of evolution.

The term "spandrel" originates from architecture, where it refers to the roughly triangular spaces between the top of an arch and the ceiling.

== Etymology ==
The term was coined by paleontologist Stephen Jay Gould and population geneticist Richard Lewontin in their paper "The Spandrels of San Marco and the Panglossian Paradigm: A Critique of the Adaptationist Programme" (1979). Evolutionary biologist Günter P. Wagner called the paper "the most influential structuralist manifesto".

In their paper, Gould and Lewontin employed the analogy of spandrels in Renaissance architecture, such as the curved areas of masonry between arches supporting a dome that arise as a consequence of decisions about the shape of the arches and the base of the dome, rather than being designed for the artistic purposes for which they were often employed. The authors singled out properties like the necessary number of four spandrels and their specific three-dimensional shape. At the time, it was widely thought in the scientific community that everything an animal has developed that has a positive effect on that animal's fitness was due to natural selection or some adaptation. Gould and Lewontin proposed an alternative hypothesis: that due to adaptation and natural selection, byproducts are also formed. Because these byproducts of adaptations had no real relative advantage to survival, they were termed spandrels. In the biological sense, a "spandrel" might result from a requirement inherent in the body plan of an organism, or as a byproduct of some other constraint on adaptive evolution.

In response to the position that spandrels are just small, unimportant byproducts, Gould and Lewontin argue that "we must not recognize that small means unimportant. Spandrels can be as prominent as primary adaptations". A main example used by Gould and Lewontin is the human brain. Many secondary processes and actions come in addition to the main functions of the human brain. These secondary processes and thoughts can eventually turn into an adaptation or provide a fitness advantage to humans. Just because something is a secondary trait or byproduct of an adaptation does not mean it has no use.

In 1982, Gould and Vrba introduced the term "exaptation" for characteristics that enhance fitness in their present role but were not built for that role by natural selection. Exaptations may be divided into two subcategories: pre-adaptations and spandrels. Spandrels are characteristics that did not originate by the direct action of natural selection and that were later co-opted for a current use. Gould saw the term to be optimally suited for evolutionary biology for "the concept of a nonadaptive architectural by-product of definite and necessary form – a structure of particular size and shape that then becomes available for later and secondary utility".

=== Criticism of the term ===
Gould and Lewontin's proposal generated a large literature of critique, which Gould characterised as being grounded in two ways. First, a terminological claim was offered that the "spandrels" of Basilica di San Marco were not spandrels at all, but rather were pendentives. Gould responded, "The term spandrel may be extended from its particular architectural use for two-dimensional byproducts to the generality of 'spaces left over', a definition that properly includes the San Marco pendentives."

Other critics, such as Daniel Dennett, further claimed (in Darwin's Dangerous Idea and elsewhere) that these pendentives are not merely architectural by-products as Gould and Lewontin supposed. Dennett argues that alternatives to pendentives, such as corbels or squinches, would have served equally well from an architectural standpoint, but pendentives were deliberately selected due to their aesthetic value. Critics such as H. Allen Orr argued that Lewontin and Gould's oversight in this regard illustrates their underestimation of the pervasiveness of adaptations found in nature.

=== Response to criticism ===
Gould responded that critics ignore that later selective value is a separate issue from origination as necessary consequences of structure; he summarised his use of the term 'spandrel' in 1997: "Evolutionary biology needs such an explicit term for features arising as byproducts, rather than adaptations, whatever their subsequent exaptive utility ... Causes of historical origin must always be separated from current utilities; their conflation has seriously hampered the evolutionary analysis of form in the history of life." Gould cites the masculinized genitalia of female hyenas and the brooding chamber of some snails as examples of evolutionary spandrels.

Gould (1991) outlines some considerations for grounds for assigning or denying a structure the status of spandrel, pointing first to the fact that a structure originating as a spandrel through primary exaptation may have been further crafted for its current utility by a suite of secondary adaptations, thus the grounds of how well crafted a structure is for a function cannot be used as grounds for assigning or denying spandrel status. The nature of the current utility of a structure also does not provide a basis for assigning or denying spandrel status, nor does he see the origin of a structure as having any relationship to the extent or vitality of a later co-opted role, but places importance on the later evolutionary meaning of a structure. This seems to imply that the design and secondary utilization of spandrels may feed back into the evolutionary process and thus determine major features of the entire structure. The grounds Gould does accept to have validity in assigning or denying a structure the status of spandrel are historical order and comparative anatomy. Historical order involves the use of historical evidence to determine which feature arose as a primary adaptation and which one appeared subsequently as a co-opted by-product. In the absence of historical evidence, inferences are drawn about the evolution of a structure through comparative anatomy. Evidence is obtained by comparing current examples of the structure in a cladistic context and by subsequently trying to determine a historical order from the distribution yielded by tabulation.

== Examples of spandrels ==
=== Human chin ===
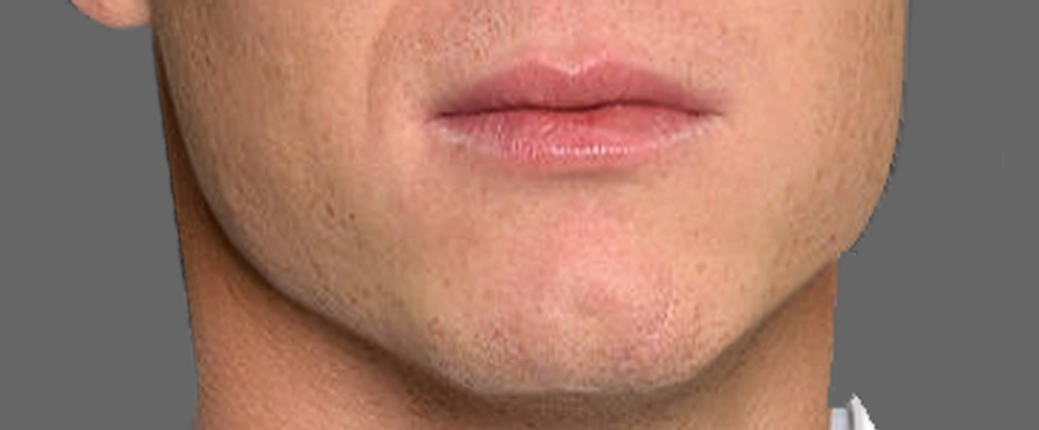

The human chin has been proposed as an example of a spandrel, since modern humans (Homo sapiens) are the only species with a chin, an anatomical feature with no known function. Alternatively however, it has been suggested that chins may be the result of selection, based on an analysis of the rate of chin evolution in the fossil record.

=== Navel ===
A commonly cited example of a spandrel is the navel: it is a necessary but fitness-neutral by-product of umbilical cords in placental mammals.

=== Language ===
There is disagreement among experts as to whether language is a spandrel.

Linguist Noam Chomsky and Gould himself have both argued that human language may have originated as a spandrel. Chomsky writes that the language faculty, and the property of discrete infinity or recursion that plays a central role in his theory of universal grammar (UG), may have evolved as a spandrel. In this view, Chomsky initially pointed to language being a result of increased brain size and increasing complexity, though he provides no definitive answers as to what factors may have led to the brain attaining the size and complexity of which discrete infinity is a consequence. Steven Pinker and Ray Jackendoff say Chomsky's case is unconvincing. Pinker contends that the language faculty is not a spandrel, but rather a result of natural selection.

Newmeyer (1998) instead views the lack of symmetry, irregularity and idiosyncrasy that universal grammar tolerates and the widely different principles of organization of its various sub-components and consequent wide variety of linking rules relating them as evidence that such design features do not qualify as an exaptation. He suggests that universal grammar cannot be derivative and autonomous at the same time, and that Chomsky wants language to be an epiphenomenon and an "organ" simultaneously, where an organ is defined as a product of a dedicated genetic blueprint. Rudolph Botha counters that Chomsky has offered his conception of the feature of recursion (the iterative concatenation of words) but not a theory of the evolution of the language faculty as a whole.

=== Music ===
There is disagreement among experts as to whether music is a spandrel.

Pinker has written that "As far as biological cause and effect are concerned, music is useless. It shows no signs of design for attaining a goal such as long life, grandchildren, or accurate perception and prediction of the world", and "I suspect that music is auditory cheesecake, an exquisite confection crafted to tickle the sensitive spots of at least six of our mental faculties." Dunbar found this conclusion odd, and stated that "it falls foul of what we might refer to as the Spandrel Fallacy: 'I haven't really had time to determine empirically whether or not something has a function, so I'll conclude that it can't possibly have one.'" Dunbar states that there are at least two potential roles of music in evolution: "One is its role in mating and mate choice, the other is its role in social bonding."

== See also ==
- Atavism
- Pleiotropy, a gene that has an effect on more than one trait
- Vestigiality
- Exaptation

== Sources ==
- Stephen Jay Gould; Richard Lewontin (1979), "The Spandrels of San Marco and the Panglossian Paradigm: A Critique of the Adaptationist Programme", Proc. R. Soc. Lond. B, 205 (1161): 581–598, Bibcode:1979RSPSB.205..581G, doi:10.1098/rspb.1979.0086, PMID 42062, S2CID 2129408
- Stephen Jay Gould (1997), "The exaptive excellence of spandrels as a term and prototype", Proceedings of the National Academy of Sciences USA, 94 (20): 10750–10755, Bibcode:1997PNAS...9410750G, doi:10.1073/pnas.94.20.10750, PMC 23474, PMID 11038582
- Stephen Jay Gould (2002). The Structure of Evolutionary Theory. Belknap Press of Harvard University Press, Cambridge, Massachusetts
- Phillip Stevens Thurtle. "The G Files: Linking 'The Selfish Gene' And 'The Thinking Reed'"
- Daniel Dennett (1995). Darwin's Dangerous Idea: Evolution and the Meanings of Life. Simon & Schuster. ISBN 0-684-82471-X.
- Marc D. Hauser, Noam Chomsky, and W. Tecumseh Fitch (2002). "The Faculty of Language: What Is It, Who Has It, and How Did It Evolve?" Science 298:1569–1579.
- Robert Mark (1996). "Architecture and Evolution" American Scientist (July–August): 383–389.
- Pinker, Steven; Jackendoff, Ray (2005). "The Faculty of Language: What's Special About It?" (PDF). Cognition. 95 (2): 201–236. doi:10.1016/j.cognition.2004.08.004. PMID 15694646. S2CID 1599505.
- Pinker, Steven; Bloom, Paul (1990). "Natural Language and Natural Selection" (PDF). Behavioral and Brain Sciences. 13 (4): 707–784. doi:10.1017/s0140525x00081061. S2CID 6167614.
- Botha, Rudolf P. (2001). "How much of language, if any, came about in the same sort of way as the brooding chamber in snails?". Language & Communication. 21 (3): 225–243. doi:10.1016/s0271-5309(01)00002-7.
