= Konrad Lorenz Institute of Ethology =

Austrian research institute

The Konrad Lorenz Institute of Ethology (German: Konrad-Lorenz-Institut für Vergleichende Verhaltensforschung or KLIVV) is a research institute in Vienna, Austria, dedicated to studying behavioral biology and the links between animal behaviour and conservation. Founded by the animal photographer Otto Koenig and his wife, the illustrator Lilli Koenig as “Biologische Station Wilhelminenberg” (Biological Station Wilhelminenberg) in 1945, it was later named after the Nobel laureate Konrad Lorenz and incorporated into the University of Veterinary Medicine Vienna in 2011.

== History and organisation ==
The “Biologische Station Wilheminenberg” was founded by the biologist couple Otto and Lilli Koenig in response to the ground-breaking research in the field of comparative ethology, including the work by Konrad Lorenz. The research institute was established in abandoned army barracks in the outskirts of Vienna’s 16th district Ottakring at the onset of the Vienna Woods, and endowed with substantial space and facilities supported by private means.

The facility developed and was re-structured into the Institute of Ethology of the Austrian Academy of Sciences in 1967. Otto Koenig, who became a public figure through his role as a presenter of nature documentaries, remained director also after this re-structuring until his retirement in 1984. He was succeeded by the ornithologist Hans Winkler. When Konrad Lorenz died in 1989, the institute was renamed after him.

Under the leadership of Hans Winkler, the Konrad Lorenz Institute was gradually modernised and both laboratories and staff were extended. This resulted in substantial refurbishments between 1985 and 2002, when Dustin J. Penn succeeded Winkler as director.

In 2011, the Konrad Lorenz Institute joined the University of Veterinary Medicine Vienna and with the Research Institute of Wildlife Ecology formed a new Department. Both research institutes combined now provide a facility for approximately 80 scientists. Director of the Konrad Lorenz Institute is now Leonida Fusani. Since spring 2015, the Konrad Lorenz Institute is also the headquarter of the Austrian Ornithological Centre (AOC).

== Research ==
The scientific work at the Konrad Lorenz Institute traditionally focusses on ethology and evolutionary aspects of animal behaviour, in particular related to sexual selection and sexual conflicts. The restructuring of 2011 broadened the research objectives to include physiological and ecological aspects of wild animals in interaction with their environment.

The institute also houses the Austrian bird ringing scheme, and is a member of the European Union for Bird Ringing (EURING).

== Other ==
- Konrad Lorenz Forschungsstelle
- Konrad Lorenz Institute for Evolution and Cognition Research
