= Modularity (biology) =

Biological concept

Modularity refers to the ability of a system to organize discrete, individual units that can overall increase the efficiency of network activity and, in a biological sense, facilitates selective forces upon the network. Modularity is observed in all model systems, and can be studied at nearly every scale of biological organization, from molecular interactions all the way up to the whole organism.

== Evolutionary origins ==
The exact evolutionary origins of biological modularity has been debated since the 1990s. In the mid 1990s, Günter Wagner argued that modularity could have arisen and been maintained through the interaction of four evolutionary modes of action:

1. Selection for the rate of adaptation: If different complexes evolve at different rates, then those evolving more quickly reach fixation in a population faster than other complexes. Thus, common evolutionary rates could be forcing the genes for certain proteins to evolve together while preventing other genes from being co-opted unless there is a shift in evolutionary rate.
2. Constructional selection: When a gene exists in many duplicated copies, it may be maintained because of the many connections it has (also termed pleiotropy). There is evidence that this is so following whole genome duplication, or duplication at a single locus. However, the direct relationship that duplication processes have with modularity has yet to be directly examined.
3. Stabilizing selection: While seeming antithetical to forming novel modules, Wagner maintains that it is important to consider the effects of stabilizing selection as it may be "an important counter force against the evolution of modularity". Stabilizing selection, if ubiquitously spread across the network, could then be a "wall" that makes the formation of novel interactions more difficult and maintains previously established interactions. Against such strong positive selection, other evolutionary forces acting on the network must exist, with gaps of relaxed selection, to allow focused reorganization to occur.
4. Compounded effect of stabilizing and directional selection: This is the explanation seemingly favored by Wagner and his contemporaries as it provides a model through which modularity is constricted, but still able to unidirectionally explore different evolutionary outcomes. The semi-antagonistic relationship is best illustrated using the corridor model, whereby stabilizing selection forms barriers in phenotype space that only allow the system to move towards the optimum along a single path. This allows directional selection to act and inch the system closer to optimum through this evolutionary corridor.

For over a decade, researchers examined the dynamics of selection on network modularity. However, in 2013 Clune and colleagues challenged the sole focus on selective forces, and instead provided evidence that there are inherent "connectivity costs" that limit the number of connections between nodes to maximize efficiency of transmission. This hypothesis originated from neurological studies that found that there is an inverse relationship between the number of neural connections and the overall efficiency (more connections seemed to limit the overall performance speed/precision of the network). This connectivity cost had yet to be applied to evolutionary analyses. Clune et al. created a series of models that compared the efficiency of various evolved network topologies in an environment where performance, their only metric for selection, was taken into account, and another treatment where performance as well as the connectivity cost were factored together. The results show not only that modularity formed ubiquitously in the models that factored in connection cost, but that these models also outperformed the performance-only based counterparts in every task. This suggests a potential model for module evolution whereby modules form from a system’s tendency to resist maximizing connections to create more efficient and compartmentalized network topologies.

== Sources ==
- SF Gilbert, JM Opitz, and RA Raff. 1996. "Resynthesizing Evolutionary and Developmental Biology". Developmental Biology. 173:357-372
- G von Dassow and E Munro. "Modularity in Animal Development and Evolution: Elements of a Conceptual Framework for EvoDevo". J. Exp. Zool. 285:307-325.
- MI Arnone and EH Davidson. 1997. The hardwiring of development: organization and function of genomic regulatory systems.
- EH Davidson. The Regulatory Genome: Gene Regulatory Networks in Development and Evolution. Academic Press, 2006.
- S Barolo and JW Posakony. 2002. "Three habits of highly effective signaling pathways: principles of transcriptional control by developmental cell signaling". Genes and Development. 16:1167-1181
- EN Trifonov and ZM Frenkel. 2009. "Evolution of protein modularity. Current Opinion in Structural Biology". 19:335-340.
- CR Baker, LN Booth, TR Sorrells, AD Johnson. 2012. "Protein Modularity, Cooperative Binding, and Hybrid Regulatory States Underlie Transcriptional Network Diversification". Cell. 151:80-95.
- Y Pritykin and M Singh. 2012. "Simple Topological Features Reflect Dynamics and Modularity in Protein Interaction Networks". PLoS Computational Biology. 9(10): e1003243
- GP Wagner. 1989. "Origin of Morphological Characters and the Biological Basis of Homology". Evolution. 43(6):1157-1171
- SB Carroll, J Grenier, and S Weatherbee. From DNA to Diversity: Molecular Genetics and the Evolution of Animal Design. Wiley-Blackwell, 2002.
