= Ludwig Huber (biologist) =

Austrian biologist

Ludwig Huber (born 25 July 1964) is an Austrian zoologist and a comparative cognitive biologist cognitive biologist at the Messerli Research Institute at the University of Veterinary Medicine Vienna, where he is co-founder and head of the Unit of Comparative Cognition. His research is focused on the experimental and comparative study of animal cognition, and he has worked with a wide variety of species, including pigeons, dogs, kea, and marmosets.

== Education and career ==
He was born in Neunkirchen, Austria, and received a MSc (1988) and a PhD (1991) from the University of Vienna (Austria), under the supervision of Rupert Riedl. From 1991 to 2000, he was an assistant professor at the Institute of Zoology, then an associate professor, and in 2010, he was co-founder and head of the Department of Cognitive Biology at the University of Vienna. In addition Huber was a lecturer at the Charles University in Prague and the Universidade Salvador (Bahia, Brazil). In 2011, he moved to the new Messerli Research Institute at the University of Veterinary Medicine Vienna, where he holds the chair of the Natural Science Foundations of Animal Ethics and Human-Animal Interactions. As a double-appointment professor, he is linked to the Medical University of Vienna.

== Research ==
His research has focused on the experimental and comparative study of animal cognition, studying a wide variety of species, including archerfish, poison frogs, tortoise, pigeons, kea, dogs, and marmosets. He has published more than a hundred research articles and book chapters on the cognition and behaviour of non-human animals.

== Honours ==
In 2011, Huber received the Ig Nobel Prize in Physiology together with Anna Wilkinson and Natalie Sebanz for their study "No evidence of contagious yawning in the red-footed tortoise Geochelone carbonaria". In 2013, he was elected an honorary ambassador of the Jane Goodall Institute Austria, and in 2015, he was elected a member of the scientific advisory board of the Berlin Institute for Advanced Study.

== Selected works ==
- Huber, L. (2000). Psychophylogenesis: innovations and limitations in the evolution of cognition. In C. Heyes & L. Huber (Eds.), The evolution of cognition (pp. 23–41). Cambridge, MA: MIT Press.
- Voelkel, B., and Huber, L. (2000). "True imitation in marmosets," Anim. Behav. 60, 195–202.
- Huber, L. (2001). "Visual categorization in pigeons," in Avian Visual Cognition, edited by R. Cook (Comparative Cognition Press, Medford, MA).
- Huber, L., and Gajdon, G. K. (2006). "Technical intelligence in animals: the kea model," Anim. Cog 9, 295–305.
- Huber, L., & Aust, U. (2006). A modified feature theory as an account of pigeon visual categorization. In E. A. Wasserman & T. R. Zentall (Eds.), Comparative cognition: Experimental explorations of animal intelligence (pp. 325–342). New York: Oxford University Press.
- Huber, L. (2009). Degrees of rationality in human and non-human animals. In S. Watanabe, A. P. Blaisdell, L. Huber, & A. Young (Eds.), Rational Animals, Irrational Humans (pp. 3–21). Tokyo: Keio University Press.
- Huber, L., Range, F., Voelkl, B., Szucsich, A., Viranyi, Z., & Miklosi, A. (2009). The evolution of imitation: what do the capacities of nonhuman animals tell us about the mechanisms of imitation? The Philosophical Transactions of the Royal Society B, 364, 2299–2309.
- Huber, L. (2010). Categories and Concepts: Language-Related Competences in Non-Linguistic Species. In M. Breed, D. & J. Moore (Eds.), Encyclopedia of Animal Behaviour (pp. 261–266). Oxford: Academic Press.
- Huber, L., & Wilkinson, A. (2012). Cognitive Evolution: A Comparative Approach. In F. G. Barth, P. Giampieri-Deutsch, & H.-D. Klein (Eds.), Sensory Perception: Mind and Matter (pp. 137–154). Wien, New York: Springer.
- Huber, L. (2016). How dogs perceive and understand us. Current Directions in Psychological Science, 25(5), 339–344. doi:10.1177/0963721416656329
