= LENA Foundation =

American non-profit organization

Logo of LENA

The Language Environment Analysis (LENA) Foundation is an American nonprofit organisation which provides tools for measuring children's language acquisition and exposure. Specifically, the LENA system consists of a digital language processor which is worn by a child and records and analyses their auditory environment, using propriety software. It then presents a summary of child-adult conversation, such as conversation turns and word counts.

The purpose of the LENA system is to encourage interactive talk between children (between the age of two to forty-eight months) and their caretakers.

The LENA system is also used for research; while useful for researchers who wish to save transcription costs or observe the child in its natural state, the accuracy of this system, while often quite high, varies between contexts, for example notably in the case of hard of hearing children. Because of this, several researchers recommend caution in using only the LENA system on its own for the purposes of scientific research.

== History ==
The LENA Foundation was established in 2009 by Terrance and Judith Paul, founders of Renaissance Learning, Inc., with the purpose of aiding children with disabilities and assisting with early learning. They were inspired by the book "Meaningful Differences in the Everyday Experience of American Children" by Dr. Betty Hart and Dr. Todd Risley.

A pilot version of the LENA system was launched in February 2006. The LENA Research Foundation was registered as a tax-exempt 501(c)(3) nonprofit in September 2010. The organisation was renamed simply LENA in 2018 and adopted the tagline "Building brains through early talk."

LENA has been used for parental feedback, linguistics or paediatrics research, and for specific clinical cases.

== Scientific background ==
LENA Device (Digital Language Processor)

In 2018, research using the LENA system showed that there was a link between children's conversational turns and activation of Broca's area (a part of the brain responsible, although not necessarily essential, for language processing).

The LENA foundation cites research by its own employees as evidence for the scientific basis of its technology. Said research claims that verbal interaction with young children has an effect on language acquisition, including verbal comprehension skills during adolescence.

== LENA System ==
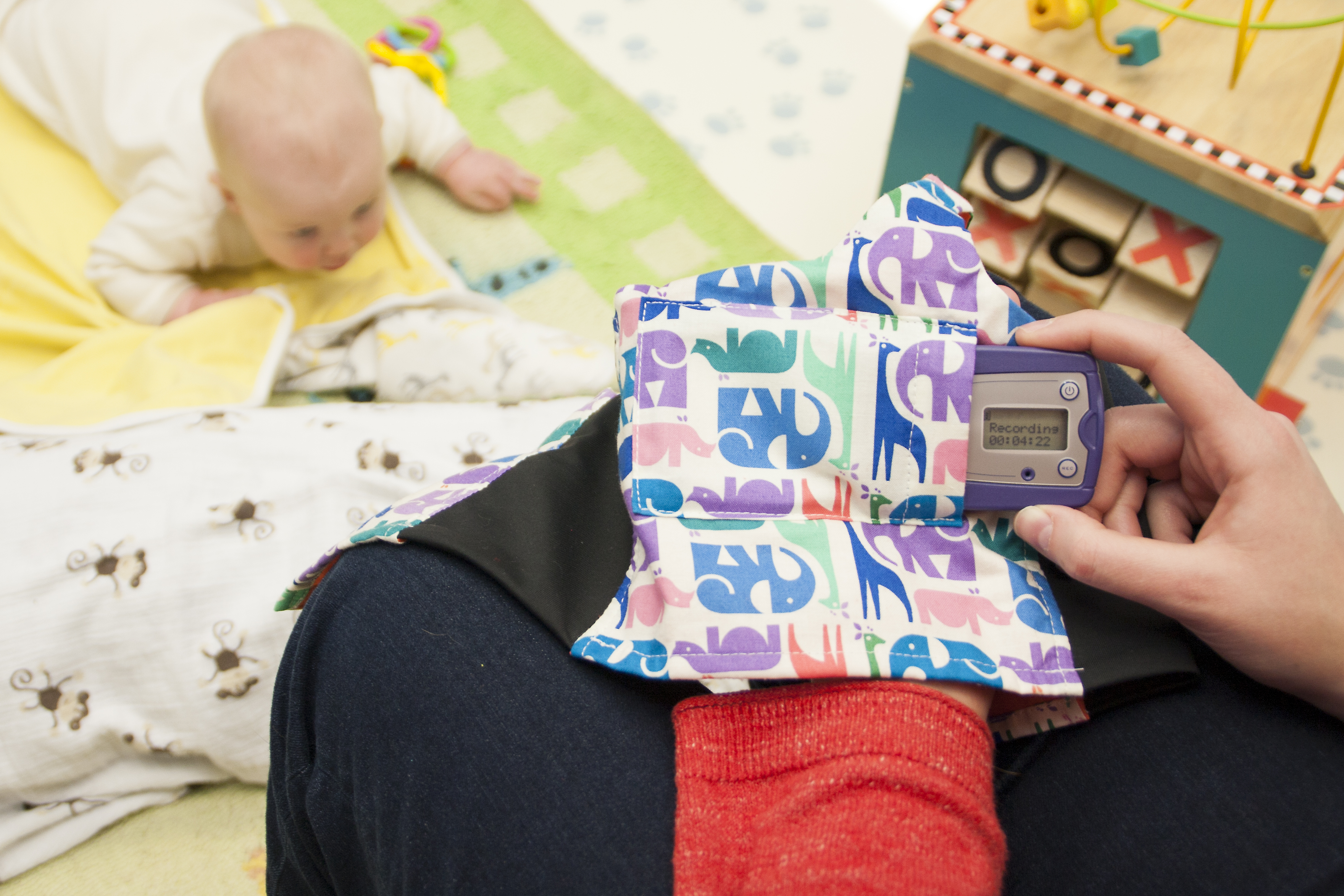
The LENA device is worn inside of specially-made, gender-neutral vests.

The LENA software analyses a child's natural language environment, such as verbal exposure, and provides several metrics, such as adult and child speech time, television/recorded audio time, word count, or conversation turn count. The LENA hardware is a recorder that is usually placed into a child's specially-designed vest.

The software was trained on over 65,000 hours of manually annotated American English audio recordings. It splits the audio into segments which are categorised as "key child", "other child", "male adult", "noise", etc.

The advantages of LENA as opposed to manual transcription are its speed and ease of use; the disadvantages are its potential inaccuracies and lack of transcription capability (which LENA does not profess to attempt). The LENA system has also been criticised for prioritising quantity of speaking over quality (i.e., mastery of the language, as opposed to babble).

== Product lines ==
=== LENA Start ===
LENA Start is a program for parents that utilises feedback from the LENA System in conjunction with weekly group sessions in order to address the home language environment. It was introduced in 2015 and implemented across several U.S. states. In October 2020, during the restrictions of the COVID-19 pandemic, Read Aloud Delaware began a virtual LENA Start program with families statewide, where parents received feedback and participated in one-hour Zoom workshops each week during the 10-week program.

=== LENA Grow ===
LENA Grow is a professional development program for teachers in early childhood classrooms. Before launching at sites around the country, the program was first piloted in Escambia County, Florida.

=== LENA Home ===
LENA Home is a supplement to existing parent coaching curricula. Typically, home visitors facilitate the use of the LENA System to help parents track their progress towards increasing interactive talk in their homes.

=== Developmental Snapshot ===
The LENA Developmental Snapshot, based on a 52-question parent survey, assesses both expressive and receptive language skills and provides an estimate of a child's developmental age from 2 months to 36 months.
