= John L. Locke =

American biolinguist

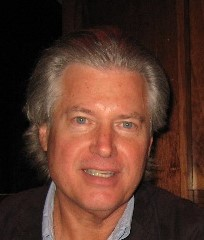
- Known for: phonological development psycholinguistics evolution of language speech and language pathology
- Scientific career
- Fields: biolinguistics language development

John L. Locke is an American biolinguist who has contributed to the understanding of language development and the evolution of language. His work has focused on how language emerges in the social context of interaction between infants, children and caregivers, how speech and language disorders can shed light on the normal developmental process and vice versa, how brain and cognitive science can help illuminate language capability and learning, and on how the special life history of humans offers perspectives on why humans are so much more intensely social and vocally communicative than their primate relatives. In recent time he has authored widely accessible volumes designed for the general public on the nature of human communication and its origins.

== Education ==
Locke has studied and worked in the United States and the United Kingdom. He received a B.A. in speech communication from Ripon College in 1963, and both an M.A. and a Ph.D. in speech pathology, audiology and speech science from Ohio University in 1965 and 1968 respectively. He went on to postdoctoral fellowships in psychology at Yale University and Oxford University in the United Kingdom (UK) from 1972 to 1974.

== Career ==
He is currently a Professor of Language Science at Lehman College of the City University of New York. He has previously been on the faculty at the University of Illinois, the University of Maryland, Harvard University, and at the University of Sheffield, and Cambridge University in the UK.

Locke's research has been funded by a wide variety of sources including the National Institutes of Health, the Axe-Houghton Foundation, the James S. McDonnell Foundation, the March of Dimes, the Cape Branch Foundation, and the Commonwealth Fund. He has held significant roles in the American Speech. Language, and Hearing Association, the Linguistic Society of America, and the Society for Research in Child Development.

He has been honored as a recipient of the Science Award from Ohio University (2002) and the Faculty Recognition Award for Research and Scholarship from Lehman College (2009).

He was a founding editor of the journal Applied Psycholinguistics, and has served on numerous other editorial boards. His administrative roles have included: director of the Interdepartmental Program in Linguistics, Lehman College (2003–2007), head of the department of human communication science, University of Sheffield, Sheffield, England (1995—1998), founding director and senior research scientist, Neurolinguistics Laboratory, Massachusetts General Hospital, Boston, Massachusetts (1984–1995), director and professor, Graduate Program in Communication Sciences and Disorders, MGH Institute of Health Professions (1983–1995), director and professor, Linguistic Institute, University of Maryland, College Park (1982), and director, Speech and Hearing Laboratory, Institute for Child Behavior and Development, University of Illinois at Urbana-Champaign (1969–1980).

== Brief summary of works ==
Locke is the author of two volumes that have played central roles in the understanding of child language development in a biological context, the first focused on the development of phonological capabilities, which Locke views as greatly under-emphasized in the study of the emergence of human language, and the second a far-ranging synthesis of evidence related to the acquisition of language. These works have been cited hundreds of times in the scientific literature, and have influenced works related specifically to phonological development, to language development in general, to language evolution, and to broad topics on developmental theory. He has recently authored two additional volumes directing attention to the significance of speech communication in the modern world, (reviewed by, among others, The New York Times and the Washington Times) and to eavesdropping and gender differences in understanding of human communication and the human condition.

Key articles among the more than 100 that he has published include fundamental contributions to: a) the understanding of infant babbling and how it lays foundations for speech, b) various aspects of communication disorders and how they illuminate the language faculty and neurolinguistics, c) a groundbreaking contribution to the understanding of how language evolved in humanity based on a theory of parental selection, and d) the role of human life history (with Barry Bogin) in language evolution, based on the argument that the prolonged developmental period of humanity includes a childhood and an adolescence, phases that are absent in non-human primates, and both of which provide extensive and long-term opportunities for learning that lay groundwork for human language and culture. Locke's collaborator, Barry Bogin, has written widely on the origins of human childhood as a special stage of development and to related topics that led to the collaboration. Locke is a widely sought-after lecturer, and has been invited to speak on his work to audiences around the world.

== Bibliography ==
- Locke, J. L. (1968). Questionable assumptions underlying articulation research. Journal of Speech and Hearing Disorders, 33, pages 112-116.
- Locke, J. L. (1970). Short-term memory encoding strategies of the deaf. Psychonomic Science, 12, pages 233-234.
- Locke, J. L., & Goldstein, J. (1973). Children's attention and articulation. Language and Speech, 16, pages 156-168.
- Locke, J. L., & Kutz, K. (1975). Memory for speech and speech for memory. Journal of Speech and Hearing Research, 18, pages 176-191.
- Locke, J. L., & Scott, K. (1979). Phonetically mediated recall in the phonetically disordered child. Journal of Communication Disorders, 12, pages 125-131.
- Locke, J. L. (1990). Structure and stimulation in the ontogeny of spoken language. Developmental Psychobiology, 23, pages 621-644.
- Locke, J. L. (1992). Neural specializations for language: a developmental perspective. Seminars in the Neurosciences, 4, pages 425-431.
- Locke, J. L., Bekken, K. E., McMinn-Larson, L., & Wein, D. (1995). Emergent control of manual and vocal-motor activity in relation to the development of speech. Brain and Language, 51, pages 498-508.
- Locke, J. L. (1998). Social sound-making as a precursor to spoken language. In Hurford, J. R., Studdert-Kennedy, M., & Knight, C. (Eds.), Approaches to the evolution of language: social and cognitive bases. Cambridge: Cambridge University Press.
- Locke, J.L. (1998) Why We Don 't Talk to Each Other Anymore: The De-Voicing of Society New York : Simon & Schuster
- Locke, J. L., & Hauser, M. D. (1999). Sex and status effects on primate volubility: clues to the origin of vocal languages? Evolution and Human Behavior, 20, pages 151-158.
- Locke, J. L., & Macaruso, P. (1999). Handedness in developmental dyslexia: direct observation of a thousand subjects. Journal of Neurolinguistics, 12, pages 147-156.
- Locke, J. L. (2001). First communion: the emergence of vocal relationships. Social Development, 10, pages 294-308.
- Locke, J. L. (2008). Cost and complexity: selection for speech and language. Journal of Theoretical Biology, 251, pages 640-652.
- Locke, J. L. (2008). Lipsmacking and babbling: syllables, sociality, and survival. In Davis, B. L., & Zajdo, K. (Eds.), The syllable in speech production: perspectives on the frame content theory. Taylor & Francis.
- Locke, J. L. (2009). Evolutionary developmental linguistics: naturalization of the faculty of language. Language Sciences, 31, pages 33-59.
