= Barbara Zurer Pearson =

American linguist

Barbara Zurer Pearson is an American linguist. She was one of the developers of the Diagnostic Evaluation of Language Variation, a screening test for distinguishing normal variations in language development and variations due to dialect from language development disorders. She has also published influential research in language acquisition by bilingual children and bidialectal children, including the acquisition of mainstream American English as a dialect by children whose native dialect is African-American Vernacular English. She is a "mostly retired" project manager in the University of Massachusetts Amherst Office of Research Development.

== Education and career ==
Zurer Pearson majored in French at Middlebury College, graduating in 1965. She continued to study linguistics at Harvard University for two years, but left with no degree. Later, she returned to her studies, receiving a master's degree in teaching English to speakers of other languages in 1980 from Florida International University, and completing her Ph.D. in applied linguistics from the University of Miami in 1988.

At the University of Miami, she worked as an adjunct lecturer in teaching English to speakers of other languages from 1977 to 1981, as a lecturer in English and director of writing and composition from 1981 to 1996, as an adjunct assistant professor of psychology from 1993 to 1996, and as a research assistant professor of English and psychology from 1996 to 1998. She moved to the University of Massachusetts Amherst in 1998 as a research associate in communications disorders, and became an adjunct assistant professor starting in 2004. She began working there as a research liaison and development officer in 2005.

== Recognition ==
Zurer Pearson was named as a Fellow of the American Association for the Advancement of Science in its 2024 class of fellows.

== Selected works ==
Zurer Pearson is the author of Raising a Bilingual Child: A Step-by-Step Guide for Parents (Random House, 2008). Her research publications include:

- Zurer Pearson, Barbara; Fernández, Sylvia C.; Oller, D. Kimbrough (March 1993), "Lexical development in bilingual infants and toddlers: comparison to monolingual norms", Language Learning, 43 (1): 93–120, doi:10.1111/j.1467-1770.1993.tb00174.x
- Zurer Pearson, Barbara; Fernández, Sylvia C.; Oller, D. Kimbrough (June 1995), "Cross-language synonyms in the lexicons of bilingual infants: one language or two?", Journal of Child Language, 22 (2): 345–368, doi:10.1017/s030500090000982x, PMID 8550727
- Pearson, Barbara Z.; Fernandez, Sylvia C.; Lewedeg, Vanessa; Oller, D. Kimbrough (January 1997), "The relation of input factors to lexical learning by bilingual infants", Applied Psycholinguistics, 18 (1): 41–58, doi:10.1017/s0142716400009863
- Zurer Pearson, Barbara (December 2002), "Chapter 7: Narrative competence among monolingual and bilingual school children in Miami", in Oller, Kimbrough; Eilers, Rebecca (eds.), Language and Literacy in Bilingual Children, Multilingual Matters, pp. 135–174, doi:10.21832/9781853595721-008, ISBN 978-1-85359-572-1
- Zurer Pearson, Barbara (June 2007), "Social factors in childhood bilingualism in the United States", Applied Psycholinguistics, 28 (3): 399–410, doi:10.1017/s014271640707021x
