= Konrad Lorenz Forschungsstelle =

Bird behavior research facility

Coordinates: 47.8139°N 13.9475°E

The Konrad Lorenz Forschungsstelle (KLF) is a research facility in Grünau im Almtal (Upper Austria), maintained jointly by private and public entities. The KLF is dedicated mainly to behavioral biology of birds and named after the Nobel laureate Konrad Lorenz, who established the facility in 1973.

== History and Organisation ==
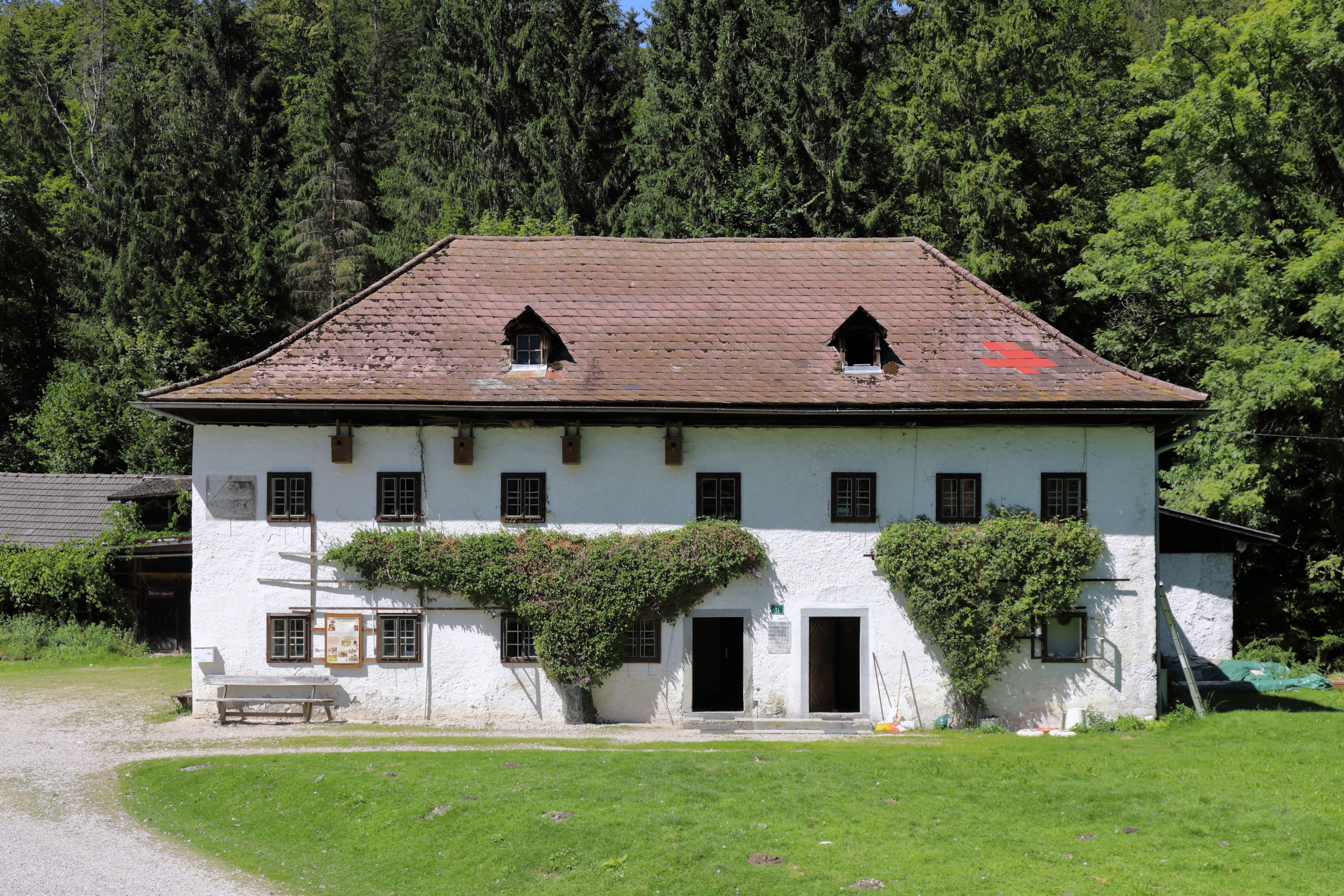
Konrad Lorenz Forschungsstelle in Grünau im Almtal

The facility was created in 1973, when Konrad Lorenz retired from his position as chair of the Max Planck Institute for Behavioral Physiology in Seewiesen (Germany) and returned to his native country Austria. Lorenz had been looking for a place to continue research on greylag geese and the biologist Otto König facilitated the establishment of an appropriate field station in association with a recently established game park in Grünau.

For seven years, the Max Planck Society financed the facility, before the Austrian Academy of Sciences took over the financing in 1980. Konrad Lorenz died in 1989, which required a re-structuring of the field station. Since 1990, the reformed Konrad Lorenz Forschungsstelle is maintained by a private association, the federal province of Upper Austria and the University of Vienna. The KLF is chaired by the behavioural biologist Kurt Kotrschal. In 2008, the Wolf Science Center was established as a spin-off of the KLF.

== Research ==
In line with the legacy of Konrad Lorenz, the research focus of the KLF lies on behavioural biology of birds and cognitive studies. Research models are in particular greylag goose, bald ibis and corvid birds. In addition to behavioural studies, the KLF is active in conservation efforts of bold ibis and was the first institution world-wide that succeeded in establishing a self-sustained colony of bold ibis from birds bred in captivity.

== Funding and facilities ==
The core—funding of 80,000 Euro per year is provided from private sources (one third) and as a subsidy by the province of Upper Austria (two thirds). Project funds add between 200,000 and 300,000 Euro per year. Two staff scientists are provided as in-kind support by the University of Vienna. This allows the KLF to operate animal facilities, research and administrative space for 10 to 15 employees and project staff.

== Other ==
- Konrad Lorenz Institute of Ethology
- Konrad Lorenz Institute for Evolution and Cognition Research
