= The Spandrels of San Marco and the Panglossian Paradigm =

1979 scientific article

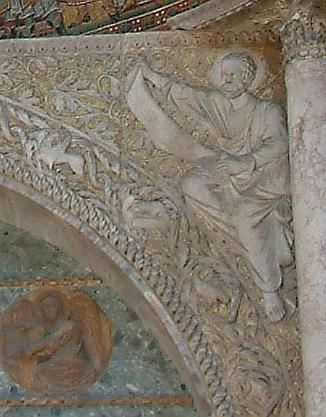
The spandrels in St Mark's Basilica inspired one of the paper's main metaphors.

"The Spandrels of San Marco and the Panglossian Paradigm: A Critique of the Adaptationist Programme", also known as the "Spandrels paper", is a paper by evolutionary biologists Stephen Jay Gould and Richard Lewontin, originally published in the Proceedings of the Royal Society B: Biological Sciences in 1979. The paper criticizes the adaptationist school of thought that was prevalent in evolutionary biology at the time using two metaphors: that of the spandrels in St Mark's Basilica, a cathedral in Venice, Italy, and that of the fictional character "Pangloss" in Voltaire's novella Candide. The paper was the first to use the architectural term "spandrel" in a biological context; the term "spandrel" has since gained currency in biology to refer to byproducts of adaptation.

== Background ==
"Spandrels" was originally written in 1978, and that year Gould delivered it as a talk to the Royal Society. Gould had visited St. Mark's Cathedral shortly before he wrote the paper. The published paper lists both Gould and Lewontin as authors. However, in a 2015 interview, Lewontin said that Gould wrote the majority of the paper, and that he had made only "a lesser contribution" to it. Gould wrote that though he had written most of the paper, Lewontin had contributed more of its ideas. The metaphorical argument, on the other hand, was due to Gould, who stated "In our little partnership, I am the pedant and he the innovator".

== Style ==
Gould referred to the paper as an "opinion piece" because, unlike most scientific papers, it was not based on a literature review or empirical data. It was written in a provocative and literary style that was unusual even compared to that of most other opinion pieces. David C. Queller described the paper as "an opinion piece, a polemic, a manifesto, and a rhetorical masterpiece".

== Arguments ==
In the "Spandrels" paper, Gould and Lewontin argue that the mosaic design on the spandrels in St. Mark's Basilica is "so elaborate, harmonious, and purposeful that we are tempted to view it as the starting point of any analysis, as the cause in some sense of the surrounding architecture." They then claim that this would be inappropriate, because the spandrels themselves were an architectural constraint that "provide a space in which the mosaicists worked". The paper makes an analogy between these spandrels and the evolutionary constraints of living organisms, and the need to distinguish between the current use of a trait and the reason it evolved. It also compares the adaptationist perspective to that of Dr. Pangloss, a character in Voltaire's Candide, who believed that the world he lived in was the best world possible. This view is embodied in the statement by Pangloss that "Everything is made for the best purpose. Our noses were made to carry spectacles, so we have spectacles. Legs were clearly intended for breeches, and we wear them." The "Spandrels" paper also criticizes adaptationists for not developing sufficiently rigorous methods to test their hypotheses.

== Impact ==
"Spandrels" has proven highly influential and controversial since it was first published. Gerald Borgia of the University of Maryland described the paper as "among the best known and most factious papers in evolutionary biology in the past 50 years." Similarly, David Sloan Wilson referred to it as "[o]ne of the most influential works in the field of evolutionary biology". It is sometimes credited with beginning the debate about the validity of adaptationism in modern evolutionary biology. However, this claim is disputed by other scholars. The paper also inspired a book, Understanding Scientific Prose, which was published in 1993. The book consists of fourteen reviews of the original 1979 paper by experts from various fields, followed by a chapter-length reply by Gould. According to Massimo Pigliucci and Jonathan Kaplan, "After the ‘Spandrels paper’, evolutionists were more careful about producing just-so stories based on selection, and paid more attention to a panoply of other processes." In 2009, Rasmus Nielsen wrote that the paper "fundamentally changed the discourse of evolutionary biology".

== Reactions ==
Ernst Mayr argued that the criticisms made by Gould and Lewontin in "Spandrels" were valid, but that the problems they identified were the result of mistakes in the execution of the adaptationist program, such as excessively atomistic and deterministic perspectives, rather than flaws of the adaptationist program itself. John Maynard Smith believed by and large "their paper had a healthy effect.… Their critique forced us to clean up our act and to provide evidence for our stories. But adaptationism remains the core of biological thinking." In reviewing Understanding Scientific Prose, Tim Radford wrote that the "Spandrels" paper was "...unusual because a nonscientist can understand exactly what is being said, and read it all the way through without nodding off, while at the same time veteran and world-leading evolutionary theorists can read it and apparently have apoplexy." Sandra Mitchell argues that the paper's arguments regarding adaptationism can be interpreted in three different ways: that adaptationist hypotheses need to be rigorously tested before they are accepted, that pluralistic explanations of biological phenomena should be widely accepted alongside adaptationist ones, or that non-adaptationist explanations are objectively preferable to adaptationist ones.

Gould and Lewontin defined "spandrel" in biology as a constraint on an organism's evolution. However, Alasdair Houston subsequently suggested that another architectural term, "pendentive", might be a more accurate description of such constraints. In his book Darwin's Dangerous Idea, Daniel Dennett also criticized Gould and Lewontin's "spandrels" metaphor for the same reason, adding, "the spandrels of San Marco aren't spandrels even in Gould's extended sense. They are adaptations chosen from a set of equipossible alternatives for largely aesthetic reasons..." This criticism was itself criticized by Robert Mark, who argued that "Gould and Lewontin's misapplication of the term spandrel for pendentive perhaps implies a wider latitude of design choice than they intended for their analogy. But Dennett's critique of the architectural basis of the analogy goes even further astray because he slights the technical rationale of the architectural elements in question." Some defenders of the adaptationist perspective developed "explanatory adaptationism" as a response to some of the arguments made in the paper. Explanatory adaptationism argues that adaptation, though uncommon, is still uniquely important in the evolutionary process.
