= Adaptationism =

Darwinian perspective that biological traits are evolved adaptations

Adaptationism is a scientific perspective on evolution that focuses on accounting for the products of evolution as collections of adaptive traits, each a product of natural selection with some adaptive rationale.

A formal alternative would be to look at the products of evolution as the result of neutral evolution, in terms of structural constraints, or in terms of a mixture of factors including (but not limited to) natural selection.

The most obvious justification for an adaptationist perspective is the belief that traits are, in fact, always adaptations built by natural selection for their functional role. This position is called "empirical adaptationism" by Godfrey-Smith. However, Godfrey-Smith also identifies "methodological" and "explanatory" flavors of adaptationism, and argues that all three are found in the evolutionary literature (see for explanation).

Although adaptationism has always existed— the view that the features of organisms are wonderfully adapted predates evolutionary thinking— and was sometimes criticized for its "Panglossian" excesses (e.g., by Bateson or Haldane), concerns about the role of adaptationism in scientific research did not become a major issue of debate until evolutionary biologists Stephen Jay Gould and Richard Lewontin penned a famous critique, "The Spandrels of San Marco and the Panglossian Paradigm". According to Gould and Lewontin, evolutionary biologists had a habit of proposing adaptive explanations for any trait by default without considering non-adaptive alternatives, and often by conflating products of adaptation with the process of natural selection. They identified neutral evolution and developmental constraints as potentially important non-adaptive factors and called for alternative research agendas.

This critique provoked defenses by Mayr, Reeve and Sherman and others, who argued that the adaptationist research program was unquestionably highly successful, and that the causal and methodological basis for considering alternatives was weak. The "Spandrels paper" (as it came to be known) also added fuel to the emergence of an alternative "evo-devo" agenda focused on developmental "constraints" Today, molecular evolutionists often cite neutral evolution as the null hypothesis in evolutionary studies, i.e., offering a direct contrast to the adaptationist approach. Constructive neutral evolution has been suggested as a means by which complex systems emerge through neutral transitions, and has been invoked to help understand the origins of a wide variety of features from the spliceosome of eukaryotes to the interdependency and simplification widespread in microbial communities.

Today, adaptationism is associated with the "reverse engineering" approach. Richard Dawkins noted in The Blind Watchmaker that evolution, an impersonal process, produces organisms that give the appearance of having been designed for a purpose. This observation justifies looking for the function of traits observed in biological organisms. This reverse engineering is used in disciplines such as psychology and economics to explain the features of human cognition. Reverse engineering can, in particular, help explain cognitive biases as adaptive solutions that assist individuals in decision-making when considering constraints such as the cost of processing information. This approach is valuable in understanding how seemingly irrational behaviors may, in fact, be optimal given the environmental and informational limitations under which human cognition operates.

== Overview ==
=== Criteria to identify a trait as an adaptation ===
Adaptationism is an approach to studying the evolution of form and function. It attempts to frame the existence and persistence of traits, assuming that each of them arose independently and improved the reproductive success of the organism's ancestors. A trait is an adaptation if it fulfils the following criteria:

1. The trait is a variation of an earlier form.
2. The trait is heritable through the transmission of genes.
3. The trait enhances reproductive success.

=== Constraints on the power of evolution ===
==== Genetic constraints ====
Genetic reality provides constraints on the power of random mutation followed by natural selection.

With pleiotropy, some genes control multiple traits, so that adaptation of one trait is impeded by effects on other traits that are not necessarily adaptive. Selection that influences epistasis is a case where the regulation or expression of one gene, depends on one or several others. This is true for a good number of genes though to differing extents. The reason why this leads to muddied responses is that selection for a trait that is epistatically based can mean that an allele for a gene that is epistatic when selected would happen to affect others. This leads to the coregulation of others for a reason other than there is an adaptive quality to each of those traits. Like with pleiotropy, traits could reach fixation in a population as a by-product of selection for another.

In the context of development the difference between pleiotropy and epistasis is not so clear but at the genetic level the distinction is more clear. With these traits as being by-products of others it can ultimately be said that these traits evolved but not that they necessarily represent adaptations.

Polygenic traits are controlled by a number of separate genes. Many traits are polygenic, for example human height. To drastically change a polygenic trait is likely to require multiple changes.

==== Anatomical constraints ====
Anatomical constraints are features of organism's anatomy that are prevented from change by being constrained in some way. When organisms diverge from a common ancestor and inherit certain characteristics which become modified by natural selection of mutant phenotypes, it is as if some traits are locked in place and are unable to change in certain ways. Some textbook anatomical constraints often include examples of structures that connect parts of the body together though a physical link.

These links are hard if not impossible to break because evolution usually requires that anatomy be formed by small consecutive modifications in populations through generations. In his book, Why We Get Sick, Randolph Nesse uses the "blind spot" in the vertebrate eye (caused by the nerve fibers running through the retina) as an example of this. He argues that natural selection has come up with an elaborate work-around of the eyes wobbling back-and-forth to correct for this, but vertebrates have not found the solution embodied in cephalopod eyes, where the optic nerve does not interrupt the view. See also: Evolution of the eye.

Another example is the cranial nerves in tetrapods. In early vertebrate evolution, sharks, skates, and rays (collectively Chondrichthyes), the cranial nerves run from the part of the brain that interprets sensory information, and radiate out towards the organs that produce those sensations. In tetrapods, however, and mammals in particular, the nerves take an elaborate winding path through the cranium around structures that evolved after the common ancestor with sharks.

== Debate with structuralism ==
Adaptationism is sometimes characterized by critics as an unsubstantiated assumption that all or most traits are optimal adaptations. Structuralist critics (most notably Richard Lewontin and Stephen Jay Gould in their "spandrel" paper) contend that the adaptationists have overemphasized the power of natural selection to shape individual traits to an evolutionary optimum. Adaptationists are sometimes accused by their critics of using ad hoc "just-so stories". The critics, in turn, have been accused of misrepresentation (Straw man argumentation), rather than attacking the actual statements of supposed adaptationists.

Adaptationist researchers respond by asserting that they, too, follow George Williams' depiction of adaptation as an "onerous concept" that should only be applied in light of strong evidence. This evidence can be generally characterized as the successful prediction of novel phenomena based on the hypothesis that design details of adaptations should fit a complex evolved design to respond to a specific set of selection pressures. In evolutionary psychology, researchers such as Leda Cosmides, John Tooby, and David Buss contend that the bulk of research findings that were uniquely predicted through adaptationist hypothesizing comprise evidence of the methods' validity.

== Purpose and function ==
There are philosophical issues with the way biologists speak of function, effectively invoking teleology, the purpose of an adaptation.

=== Function ===
To say something has a function is to say something about what it does for the organism. It also says something about its history: how it has come about. A heart pumps blood: that is its function. It also emits sound, which is considered to be an ancillary side-effect, not its function. The heart has a history (which may be well or poorly understood), and that history is about how natural selection formed and maintained the heart as a pump. Every aspect of an organism that has a function has a history. Now, an adaptation must have a functional history: therefore we expect it must have undergone selection caused by relative survival in its habitat. It would be quite wrong to use the word adaptation about a trait which arose as a by-product.

=== Teleology ===
Teleology was introduced into biology by Aristotle to describe the adaptedness of organisms. Biologists have found the implications of purposefulness awkward as they suggest supernatural intention, an aspect of Plato's thinking which Aristotle rejected. A similar term, teleonomy, grew out of cybernetics and self-organising systems and was used by biologists of the 1960s such as Ernst Mayr and George C. Williams as a less loaded alternative. On the one hand, adaptation is obviously purposeful: natural selection chooses what works and eliminates what does not. On the other hand, biologists want to deny conscious purpose in evolution. The dilemma gave rise to a famous joke by the evolutionary biologist Haldane: "Teleology is like a mistress to a biologist: he cannot live without her but he's unwilling to be seen with her in public.'" David Hull commented that Haldane's mistress "has become a lawfully wedded wife. Biologists no longer feel obligated to apologize for their use of teleological language; they flaunt it. The only concession which they make to its disreputable past is to rename it 'teleonomy'."

== See also ==
- Adaptive evolution in the human genome
- Beneficial acclimation hypothesis
- Constructive neutral evolution
- Evolutionary failure
- Exaptation
- Gene-centered view of evolution
- Neutral theory of molecular evolution
- Vitalism

== Sources ==
- Cronin, H. (1992). The Ant and the Peacock: Altruism and Sexual Selection from Darwin to Today. Cambridge: Cambridge University Press. ISBN 978-0-521-32937-8.
- Gould, S.J.; Lewontin, R.C. (1979). "The spandrels of San Marco and the Panglossian paradigm: A critique of the adaptationist programme". Proceedings of the Royal Society of London B. 205 (1161): 581–598. Bibcode:1979RSPSB.205..581G. doi:10.1098/rspb.1979.0086. PMID 42062. S2CID 2129408.
- Hull, David L. (1982). "Philosophy and biology". In Fløistad, Guttorm (ed.). Philosophy of Science. Contemporary Philosophy: A New Survey. Vol. 2. The Hague: Martinus Nijhoff Publishers; Springer Netherlands. doi:10.1007/978-94-010-9940-0. ISBN 978-90-247-2518-2. LCCN 81003972. OCLC 502399533.
- Lewontin, R.C. (1979). "Sociobiology as an adaptationist program". Behavioral Science. 24 (1): 5–14. doi:10.1002/bs.3830240103. PMID 435219.
- Lewontin, R.C. (1993). Biology as Ideology: The Doctrine of DNA. New York: Harper Collins. ISBN 978-0-06-097519-7.
- Maynard Smith, J. (1988). Did Darwin get it right? Essays on games, sex and evolution. London: Penguin books. ISBN 978-0-14-023013-0.
- Mayr, Ernst (1965). "Cause and Effect in Biology". In Lerner, Daniel (ed.). Cause and Effect. The Hayden Colloquium on Scientific Method and Concept. New York: Free Press. LCCN 65015439. OCLC 384895.
- Mayr, Ernst (1988). Toward a New Philosophy of Biology: Observations of an Evolutionist. Cambridge, MA: Belknap Press of Harvard University Press. ISBN 978-0-674-89665-9. LCCN 87031892. OCLC 17108004.
- Monod, Jacques (1971). Chance and Necessity: An Essay on the Natural Philosophy of Modern Biology. Translation of Le hasard et la nécessité by Austryn Wainhouse (1st American ed.). New York: Knopf. ISBN 978-0-394-46615-6. LCCN 77154929. OCLC 209901.
- Orzack, S.H.; Sober, E.R., eds. (2001). Adaptationism and Optimality. Cambridge: Cambridge University Press. ISBN 978-0-521-59166-9.
- Pittendrigh, Colin S. (1958). "Adaptation, Natural Selection, and Behavior". In Roe, Anne; Simpson, George Gaylord (eds.). Behavior and Evolution. New Haven, CT: Yale University Press. LCCN 58011260. OCLC 191989.
- Sober, E. (1998). "Six Sayings about Adaptationism". In D. Hull; M. Ruse (eds.). The Philosophy of Biology. Oxford: Oxford University Press. ISBN 978-0-19-875213-4.
- Sober, Elliott (1993). Philosophy of Biology. Dimensions of Philosophy Series. Boulder, CO: Westview Press. ISBN 978-0-8133-0785-5. LCCN 92037484. OCLC 26974492.
- Williams, George C. (1966). Adaptation and Natural Selection: A Critique of Some Current Evolutionary Thought. Princeton Science Library. Princeton, NJ: Princeton University Press. ISBN 978-0-691-02615-2. LCCN 65017164. OCLC 35230452.
