= Luciano da Fontoura Costa =

Luciano da Fontoura Costa (born December 1962 in São Carlos, SP, Brazil) is a full professor at the Institute of Physics at São Carlos, University of São Paulo, where he coordinates the Multidisciplinary Computing Group.

== Career ==
Luciano received his BSc in Electronic Engineering in 1984 from the University of São Paulo, his MSc in Applied Physics (Univ. São Paulo), and his PhD in Electronic Engineering from King's College, University of London.

He was elected Visiting Scholar by St Catharine's College, University of Cambridge, UK (2008), and is a member of the Konrad Lorenz Institute, Austria. Costa has participated in several international projects, including a Human Frontiers Grant with the Salk Institute and the University of Vienna.

== Research ==
His main research interests include complex networks, image analysis, pattern recognition, scientific visualization and digital signal processing. He studied the relationship between neuronal shape, connectivity, and dynamics, including percolation studies.

== Bibliography ==
=== Books ===
- 2001: Luciano da Fontoura Costa; Roberto Marcondes Cesar, Jr. Shape Analysis and Classification: theory and practice, Boca Raton: CRC Press ISBN 1-4200-3755-2
  - Shape Classification and Analysis: theory and practice; second edition. Boca Raton: CRC Press, 2009 ISBN 0-8493-7929-6

=== Some recent open publications ===
- Complex networks as filters, Frontiers in Neuroscience, 3:1-13, 2009
- Outlier motifs in complex networks, Europhysics Letters, 87:18008, 2009.
- Characterization of subgraph relationships and distribution in complex networks, New Journal of Physics, 11:013058, 2009.
- Edge detection in complex networks, New Journal of Physics, 11:063019, 2009.
- What are the best concentric descriptors for complex networks?, New Journal of Physics, 9:311, 2007.
- 2D pattern evolution constrained by complex network dynamics, New Journal of Physics, 9: 108, 2007.
- Studies of aberrant phyllotaxy1 Mutants of Maize Indicate Complex Interactions between Auxin and Cytokinin: Signaling in the Shoot Apical Meristem Plant Physiology, 150: 205-216, 2009
