= Stuart Newman =

American biologist

- Born: Stuart Alan Newman; April 4, 1945 (age 81); New York City, New York
- Education: Columbia University; University of Chicago
- Scientific career
- Fields: Developmental Biology; Evolutionary Biology
- Workplaces: State University of New York at Albany; New York Medical College
- Doctoral advisor: Stuart A. Rice

Stuart Alan Newman (born April 4, 1945 in New York City) is a professor of cell and molecular physiology at New York Medical College in Valhalla, NY, United States. His research centers around three program areas: cellular and molecular mechanisms of vertebrate limb development, physical mechanisms of morphogenesis, and mechanisms of morphological evolution. He also writes about social and cultural aspects of biological research and technology.

== Education and background ==
Stuart Newman graduated from Jamaica High School in Queens, New York. He received an A.B. from Columbia College of Columbia University in 1965, and a Ph.D. in chemical physics from the University of Chicago in 1970, where he worked with the physical chemist, Stuart A. Rice. He was a postdoctoral fellow in the Department of Theoretical Biology, University of Chicago and the School of Biological Sciences, University of Sussex, UK, and before joining New York Medical College was an instructor in anatomy at the University of Pennsylvania and an assistant professor of biological sciences at the State University of New York at Albany.

He has been a visiting professor at the Pasteur Institute, Paris, the Commissariat à l'Energie Atomique-Saclay, the Indian Institute of Science, Bangalore, the University of Tokyo, Komaba, and was a Fogarty Senior International Fellow at Monash University, Australia. He is a member of the External Faculty of the Konrad Lorenz Institute for Evolution and Cognition Research, Klosterneuburg, Austria and from 2015 through 2025 was editor-in-chief of the institute's journal Biological Theory. He is a director of the Indigenous Peoples Council on Biocolonialism, Nixon, NV and was a founding member of the Council for Responsible Genetics, Cambridge, MA, and of the editorial board of the Journal of Biosciences (Bangalore).

== Scientific work ==
=== Developmental biology ===
Newman has been a pioneer in physical approaches to biological morphogenesis and pattern formation. With the theoretical chemist H.L. Frisch, he proposed a mechanism for patterning of the vertebrate limb skeleton based on the self-organization of embryonic tissues. The Newman-Frisch model is now the generally accepted basis of tetrapod limb development. It provided the index application for the multicellular problem solving environment CompuCell3D, developed by James A. Glazier and his collaborators.

He has also characterized a biophysical effect in extracellular matrices populated with cells or nonliving particles, "matrix-driven translocation", that provides a physical model for morphogenesis of mesenchymal tissues. He is co-author, with the physicist Gabor Forgacs, of the textbook Biological Physics of the Developing Embryo (Cambridge University Press, 2005).

He has proposed a mechanism of cell differentiation in animals. Based on a detailed consideration of gene regulatory components and processes that distinguish this group from all other forms of life, including their nearest holozoan relatives, he has suggested that the topologically associating domains found in metazoan embryonic cell nuclei have a unique propensity (due to the presence of enhancers and p300-CBP coactivator proteins) to amplify and partition into specialized cells inherent physiological and structural functionalities of unicellular ancestors. This model was the first to propose a central role for biomolecular condensates in the generation of differentiated cells in metazoans.

=== Evolutionary biology ===
Newman's work in evolutionary biology includes a theory for the origination of the animal phyla. This is proposed to have been driven by new physical morphogenetic and patterning effects set into motion when the products of the ancient developmental-genetic toolkit genes first came to operate on the multicellular scale in the late Precambrian-early Cambrian. The resulting forms were then "locked in" by stabilizing selection.

With the evolutionary biologist Gerd B. Müller, Newman edited Origination of Organismal Form (MIT Press, 2003). This book on evolutionary developmental biology is a collection of papers by various researchers on generative mechanisms that were plausibly involved in the origination of disparate body forms during the Ediacaran and early Cambrian periods. Particular attention is given to epigenetic factors, such as physical determinants and environmental parameters, that may have led to the rapid emergence of body plans and organ forms during a period when multicellular organisms had relatively plastic morphologies.

Newman has advanced a novel scenario for the origin of birds, the Thermogenic Muscle Hypothesis. Characteristic anatomical specializations of birds, e.g., bipedality, the capacity for flight, are proposed to be secondary to the hyperplasia of thigh and breast skeletal muscles that arose in compensation for the loss of several genes in saurian ancestors.

=== Inherency and agency in the emergence of phenotypic novelty ===
Consistent with his exploration of inherent physical mechanisms of morphogenesis and intrinsic cellular sources of multicellular function, Newman is a critic of reproductive fitness as the basis of major evolutionary transitions. He has argued against the selected effect theory of biological function in favor of a view that features organismal agency as the means by which novelties are converted into enablements.

== Activities around biology and society ==
Newman has long warned of dangers associated with lax regulations of genetic engineering of microorganisms and the potential of laboratory manipulation to create new bacterial and viral pathogens. In May of 2020 he was among the earliest scientists to speak publicly about the possibility that the COVID-19 pandemic virus SARS-CoV-2 was constructed in a laboratory.

He has also been an outspoken critic of proposed uses of developmental biology to modify human species identity, including cloning and germline genetic manipulation. In 1997, to encourage public discussion of these emerging technologies, he applied for a U.S. patent on a human-nonhuman chimera, a composite organism (like the "geep") arising from a mixture of embryonic cells of two or more species. Although the patent was ultimately denied, it raised Constitutional and moral questions and was the subject of numerous articles in the legal and philosophical literature. Newman's patent application has been credited with inspiring the provision in the Leahy–Smith America Invents Act of 2011 that "no patent may issue on a claim directed to or encompassing a human organism."

His book, Biotech Juggernaut: Hope, Hype, and Hidden Agendas of Entrepreneurial Bioscience (Routledge, 2019), written with the historian M.L. Tina Stevens, describes the rise of the field of human-oriented biotechnology and presents the scientific case against engineering human embryos.

== See also ==
- Transhumanism: Feasibility
- Transhumanism: Loss of human identity
- Human chimera: Patenting
