= Gerd B. Müller =

Austrian biologist (born 1953)

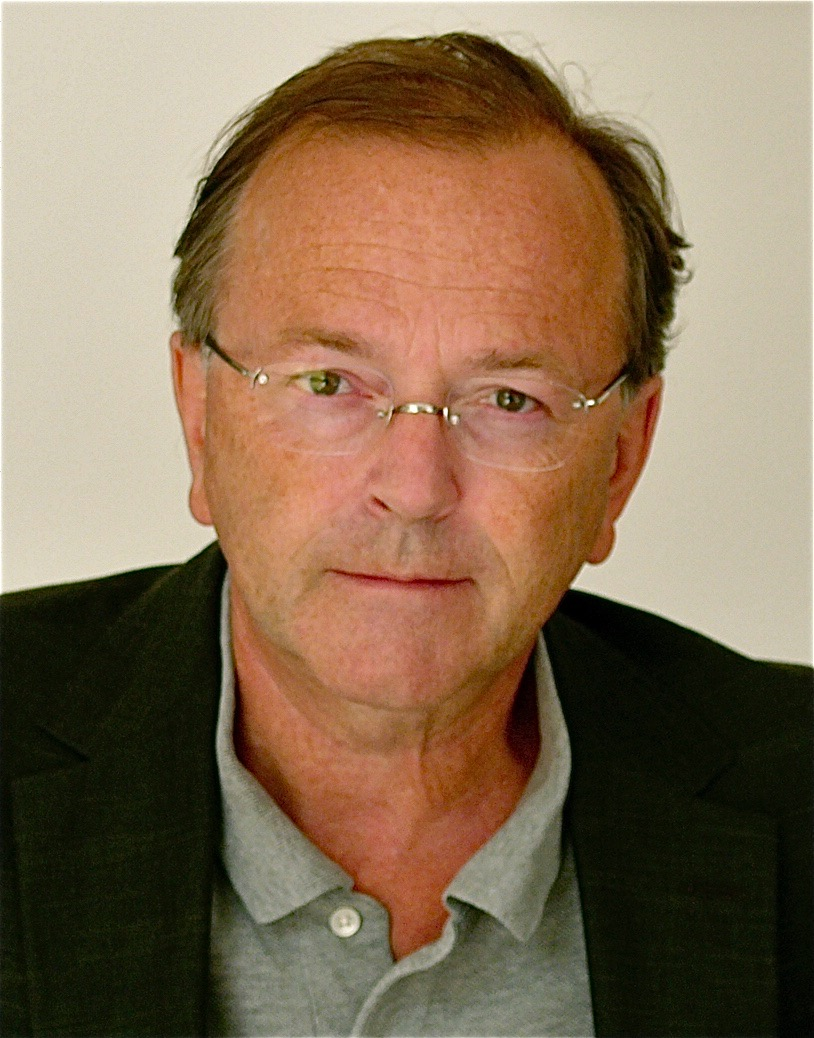
- Born: April 17, 1953 (age 73); Salzburg, Austria
- Known for: Evolutionary novelty, Extended Evolutionary Synthesis
- Scientific career
- Fields: EvoDevo, evolutionary theory, theoretical biology
- Workplaces: University of Vienna, Konrad Lorenz Institute for Evolution and Cognition Research

Gerd B. Müller (born 1953) is an Austrian biologist who is emeritus professor at the University of Vienna where he was the head of the Department of Theoretical Biology in the Center for Organismal Systems Biology. His research interests focus on vertebrate limb development, evolutionary novelties, evo-devo theory, and the Extended Evolutionary Synthesis. He is also concerned with the development of 3D based imaging tools in developmental biology.

== Biography ==
Müller received an M.D. in 1979 and a Ph.D. in zoology in 1985, both from the University of Vienna. He has been a sabbatical fellow at the Department of Developmental Biology, Dalhousie University, Canada, (1988) and a visiting scholar at the Museum of Comparative Zoology, Harvard University, and received his Habilitation in Anatomy and Embryology in 1989. He is a founding member of the Konrad Lorenz Institute for Evolution and Cognition Research, Klosterneuburg, Austria, of which he has been President since 1997. Müller is on the editorial boards of several scientific journals, including Biological Theory where he serves as an associate editor. He is editor-in-chief of the Vienna Series in Theoretical Biology, a book series devoted to theoretical developments in the biosciences, published by MIT Press.

== Scientific contribution ==
Müller has published on developmental imaging, vertebrate limb development, the origins of phenotypic novelty, EvoDevo theory, and evolutionary theory.

With cell and developmental biologist Stuart Newman, Müller co-edited the book Origination of Organismal Form (MIT Press, 2003). This book on evolutionary developmental biology is a collection of papers on generative mechanisms that were plausibly involved in the origination of disparate body forms during early periods of organismal life. Particular attention is given to epigenetic factors, such as physical determinants and environmental parameters, that may have led to the spontaneous emergence of bodyplans and organ forms during a period when multicellular organisms had relatively plastic morphologies. Natural selection acting on variant genotypes is suggested to have "locked in" these bodyplans.

Together with Eva Jablonka, Kevin Laland, Alex Mesoudi, Stuart Newman, Massimo Pigliucci, Kim Sterelny, John Odling-Smee, Tobias Uller, as well as Denis Noble and others, Gerd Müller is an advocate of an alternative evolutionary framework, one version of which has been termed the Extended Evolutionary Synthesis (EES). In contrast to the Modern Synthesis, the population dynamical model of evolution established in the early twentieth century that had concentrated on the processes of variation and adaptation, the focus of the EES is on the generative properties of evolution, integrating conceptual developments from evolutionary developmental biology, genomics, ecology, and other fields. It differs from the standard theory in its inclusion of the constructive processes in development, the consideration of reciprocal dynamics of causation, and the relinquishment of a predominantly genetic explanation. A range of novel predictions and testable empirical projects result from the EES.

== Publications ==
Scientific papers

- ResearchGate

Edited books

- Evolution – The Extended Synthesis (2010, together with Massimo Pigliucci)
- Modeling Biology (2007, together with M. Laubichler)
- Environment, Development, and Evolution: Towards a Synthesis (2004, together with Brian K. Hall and Roy D. Pearson)
- Origination of Organismal Form (2003, together with Stuart Newman)

Selected articles

- Lange, Axel; Müller, Gerd B. (2017). "Polydactyly in Development, Inheritance, and Evolution". The Quarterly Review of Biology. 92 (1): 1–38. doi:10.1086/690841. PMID 29558608.
- Favé, M-J; Johnson, RA; Cover, S; Handschuh, S; Metscher, BD; Müller, GB; Gopalan, S; Abouheif, E (2015). "Past climate change on Sky Islands drives novelty in a core developmental gene network and its phenotype". BMC Evolutionary Biology. 15 (1) 183. Bibcode:2015BMCEE..15..183F. doi:10.1186/s12862-015-0448-4. PMC 4560157. PMID 26338531.
- Laland, KN; Uller, T; Feldman, MW; Sterelny, K; Müller, GB; Moczek, A; Jablonka, E; Odling-Smee, J (2015). "The Extended Evolutionary Synthesis: Its structure, assumptions and predictions". Proc Biol Sci. 282 (1813) 20151019. doi:10.1098/rspb.2015.1019. PMC 4632619. PMID 26246559.
- Noble, D; Jablonka, E; Joyner, MJ; Müller, GB; Omholt, SW (2014). "Evolution evolves: Physiology returns to centre stage". J Physiol (Lond). 592 (11): 2237–2244. doi:10.1113/jphysiol.2014.273151. PMC 4048083. PMID 24882808.
- Mayer, C; Metscher, BD; Müller, GB; Mitteroecker, P (2014). "Studying developmental variation with geometric morphometric image analysis (GMIA)". PLOS ONE. 9 (12) e115076. Bibcode:2014PLoSO...9k5076M. doi:10.1371/journal.pone.0115076. PMC 4264869. PMID 25500820.
- Lange, A; Nemeschkal, HL; Müller, GB (2014). "Biased polyphenism in polydactylous cats carrying a single point mutation: The Hemingway model for digit novelty". Evol Biol. 41 (2): 262–275. Bibcode:2014EvBio..41..262L. doi:10.1007/s11692-013-9267-y.
- Čapek, D; Metscher, BD; Müller, GB (2013). "Thumbs down: A molecular-morphogenetic approach to avian digit homology". J Exp Zool B Mol Dev Evol. 322 (1): 1–12. doi:10.1002/jez.b.22545. PMID 24323741.
- Peterson, T; Müller, GB (2013). "What is evolutionary novelty? Process versus character based definitions". J Exp Zool B Mol Dev Evol. 320 (6): 345–350. Bibcode:2013JEZB..320..345P. doi:10.1002/jez.b.22508. PMID 23794420.
- Metscher, BD; Müller, GB (2011). "MicroCT for molecular imaging: Quantitative visualization of complete three-dimensional distributions of gene products in embryonic limbs". Dev Dyn. 240 (10): 2301–2308. doi:10.1002/dvdy.22733. PMID 21901786.
- Müller GB. 2008. Evo-devo as a discipline. In: Minelli A, Fusco G, editors. Evolving Pathways: Key Themes in Evolutionary Developmental Biology. Cambridge: Cambridge University Press.
- Müller, GB (2007). "Evo-devo: Extending the evolutionary synthesis". Nat Rev Genet. 8 (12): 943–949. doi:10.1038/nrg2219. PMID 17984972.
- Müller, GB; Newman, SA (2005). "The innovation triad: An EvoDevo agenda". J Exp Zool B Mol Dev Evol. 304 (6): 487–503. Bibcode:2005JEZB..304..487M. doi:10.1002/jez.b.21081. PMID 16299770.
