= Günter P. Wagner =

Austrian evolutionary biologist (born 1954)

- Wagner in 2008
- Born: May 28, 1954 (age 72); Vienna, Austria
- Education: University of Vienna
- Awards: MacArthur Fellowship (1992); A.O. Kovalevsky Medal (2016); Daniel Giraud Elliot Medal (2018)
- Scientific career
- Fields: evolutionary biology, evolutionary developmental biology
- Doctoral advisor: Rupert Riedl

Günter P. Wagner (born May 28, 1954) is an Austrian-born evolutionary biologist who is Professor of Ecology and Evolutionary biology at Yale University, and head of the Wagner Lab.

== Education and training ==
After undergraduate education in chemical engineering, Wagner studied zoology and mathematical logic at the University of Vienna, Austria. During his graduate study, Wagner worked with the Viennese zoologist Rupert Riedl and the theoretical chemist Peter Schuster, and finished his PhD in theoretical population genetics in 1979. Wagner conducted postdoctoral research at Max Planck Institutes in Göttingen and Tübingen, as well as at the University of Göttingen.

Wagner began his academic career as assistant professor in the Theoretical Biology Department of the University of Vienna in 1985. In 1991, he moved to Yale University as a full professor of biology and has served as the first chair of Yale's Department of Ecology and Evolution from 1997 2002 and then from 2005 to 2008.

== Work ==
The focus of Wagner's work is on the evolution of complex characters. His research utilizes both the theoretical tools of population genetics as well as experimental approaches in evolutionary developmental biology. Wagner has contributed substantially to the current understanding of evolvability of complex organisms, the origin of novel characters, and modularity.

=== Population genetics ===
Wagner's early work was focused on mathematical population genetics. Together with the mathematician Reinhard Bürger at the University of Vienna, he contributed to the theory of mutation–selection balance and the evolution of dominance modifiers. Later Wagner shifted his focus on issues of the evolution of variational properties like canalization and modularity. He introduced the seminal distinction between variation and variability, the former describing the actually existing differences among individuals while the latter measures the tendency to vary, as measured in mutation rate and mutational variance. He published the first mathematical model for the evolution of genetic canalization, and thus contributed to the renaissance of studies of canalization in the mid 1990s. His more recent work is on the measurement of gene interaction, the evolution of evolvability and how it relates to the evolution of genetic architecture.

=== Evolutionary developmental biology ===
With the advent of comparative developmental genetics in the early 1991 Wagner's research program shifted towards the molecular evolution of developmental genes, initially Hox genes and Hox gene clusters. The Wagner lab was the first to identify major blocks of ultraconserved non-coding sequences in the intergenic regions between Hox genes, and dated the “fish-specific” Hox cluster duplication to nearly coincide with the most recent common ancestor of Teleostei fish. This work led to the theory that Hox cluster and genome duplications create a window of opportunity which, if coincidental with ecological changes, can lead to the fixation of these genes and novel gene functions.

In recent years the Wagner lab has focussed on the evolution of gene regulatory networks, in particular the role of transcription factor protein evolution in evolutionary innovation. In August 2016, an article by Wagner and Mihaela Pavlicev, gained attention for proposing a possible evolutionary connection between the female orgasm in humans and ovulation induced by copulation in other mammals.

=== Homology and innovation ===
A key conceptual and mechanistic problem in evolutionary biology is the nature of character identity, aka homology. Wagner was an early proponent of a mechanistic understanding of homology, together with Louise Roth at Duke University and Gerd Müller at the University of Vienna. A test case for this approach arose when Wagner and his colleague Jacques Gauthier proposed a solution of the century-old problem of the identity of avian digits. The core of the problem is that the three digits in the bird wing have the morphology of digits 1, 2, and 3, but develop from the digit condensations 2, 3, and 4, which according to some shows that they should be digits 2, 3, and 4. Wagner and Gauthier proposed that during the evolution of theropod dinosaurs, the closest relatives of birds, digits have "changed place" so that in the bird wing digit 1 develops from position 2 and digit 2 from position 3 and digit 3 from position 4 in the wing bud. This view is now strongly supported by molecular and experimental evidence and shows how mechanistic insights can solve seemingly intractable conceptual problems.

According to Wagner the homology concept has a complementary twin, that of innovation. While homology refers to the historical continuity of character identity, the term innovation refers to the origin of novel characters, i.e. the origin of novel homologues. Therefore, Wagner and Müller argue that the origin and maintenance of character identity is a central goal of evolutionary developmental biology.

== Awards ==
Wagner the is recipient of numerous awards, among them the prestigious MacArthur Prize in 1992, and the Humboldt Prize in 2007. He received nominations as Gomperz Lecturer, University of California, Berkeley 1993; Koopmans Distinguished Lecturer, IIASA Vienna 1995; Sewall Wright Speaker, University of Chicago, IL, 1996. He is also a corresponding Member of Austrian Academy of Sciences (1997), a Fellow of the American Association for the Advancement of Science (1997), and a Fellow of the American Academy of Arts and Sciences (2010). He was elected to the National Academy of Sciences in 2018.

== Publications ==
Wagner has published four books, numerous book chapters and more than 270 scientific articles.

Books

- The Character Concept in Evolutionary Biology, Academic Press. 2000
- Modularity in Development and Evolution, University of Chicago Press, 2004
- Morphology and the Evolution of Development, Yale University Press. 2007
- Homology, Genes, and Evolutionary Innovation. Princeton University Press. 2014

Articles

- ResearchGate Publication list
