= Konrad Lorenz Institute for Evolution and Cognition Research =

International research institute

Coordinates: 48.3109°N 16.3238°E

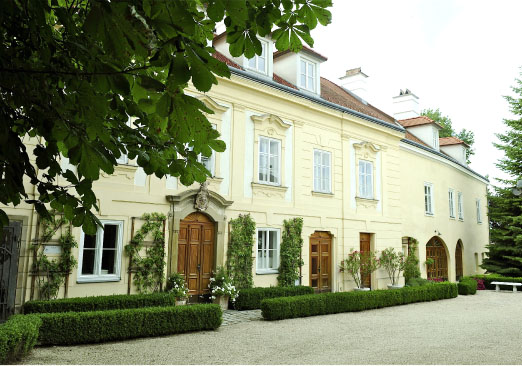
New KLI building in Klosterneuburg

The Konrad Lorenz Institute for Evolution and Cognition Research (KLI) is an international center for advanced studies in the life and sustainability sciences. It is a "Home to Theory that Matters" that supports the articulation, analysis, and integration of theories in biology and the sustainability sciences, exploring their wider scientific, cultural, and social significance. The institute is located in Klosterneuburg, near Vienna, Austria. Until 2013, the institute was located in the family mansion of the Nobel Laureate Konrad Lorenz in Altenberg. Lorenz' work laid the foundation for an evolutionary approach to mind and cognition.

The institute unites fellows, visiting scholars, students, and external faculty. Through a lecture and seminar series, the KLI also offers a platform for the critical public discussion of current themes in the biosciences.

Founded in 1990 by Rupert Riedl, followed by Gerd B. Müller (1998-2023) and Philipp Mitteröcker (since 2024) as presidents of the institute, the KLI is funded by a private trust and receives additional support from the Province of Lower Austria. The institute has close ties with many of the higher education institutions in Vienna and Lower Austria, as well as with a number of international institutions with similar aims.

== Activities ==
The KLI supports theoretical research primarily in the areas of evolutionary developmental biology, evolutionary cognitive science, and sustainability science that welcome an evolutionary approach. This is accomplished by providing fellowships to graduate students, postdocs, and visiting scientists for research projects they have proposed. In addition, the KLI organizes lecture series, organizes symposia, and hosts workshops. The KLI provides an extensive internet database for literature in theoretical biology and related fields. Together with Springer Science+Business Media, it publishes the journal Biological Theory.

=== Fellows ===
Fellows are scientists and scholars (e.g., in the biological and social sciences and in the humanities) who come to the KLI to work on a project corresponding to the aims of the institute. The KLI primarily supports theoretical research in the fields of evolutionary developmental biology, evolutionary cognitive science, and the sustainability sciences, but KLI is open to other related and interdisciplinary fields of research. Past and current fellows have come from a large number of countries, and have been trained in various disciplines within the social and natural sciences, and humanities.

=== KLI Lab / KLI Colloquia ===
The KLI Lab provides a flexible format for informal talks and peer discussion, primarily aimed at presenting work in progress related to the institute's aims. The KLI Colloquia are regular events hosting scholars outside of the KLI to give talks and engage with informal discussions with KLI fellows.

=== Altenberg Workshops in Theoretical Biology ===
The Altenberg Workshops in Theoretical Biology are meetings focused on a key issue of biology, cognition, behavior, or sustainability. All workshops are organized by leading experts in their field, who invite an international group of experts on the topic as participants.

The meetings are fully sponsored by the KLI and have only one requirement: The organizers are requested to generate a book on the workshop topic. These are not conference proceedings but edited books which further develop in their chapters the novel ideas and concepts that were produced at the meeting. The organizers of each workshop act as the editors of the book, but contributors to the book are not necessarily limited to the original participants and may include additional experts on those topics that emerged as especially important for the workshop topic.

By this procedure, the KLI intends to generate new conceptual advances and research initiatives in the bio-sciences, which, due to their interdisciplinary nature, are attractive to a wide variety of scientists from almost all fields of biology and related disciplines. Books are fully reviewed and, if accepted, published by MIT Press as part of their "Vienna Series in Theoretical Biology".

=== Summer Schools ===
The KLI hosts regular summer schools as part of the European Advanced School in the Philosophy of Life Sciences.

== Other Konrad Lorenz institutions ==
Two other institutions in Austria are named after Konrad Lorenz. Both the Konrad Lorenz Research Station in Grünau and the Konrad Lorenz Institute for Ethology in Vienna, an institute of the Austrian Academy of Sciences, pursue research in behavioral ecology, including animal cognition in the tradition of Konrad Lorenz.

== See also ==
- Gerd Müller
- Werner Callebaut
- Konrad Lorenz Forschungsstelle
- Konrad Lorenz Institute of Ethology
