= Orthogenesis =

Hypothesis that organisms have an innate tendency to evolve towards some goal

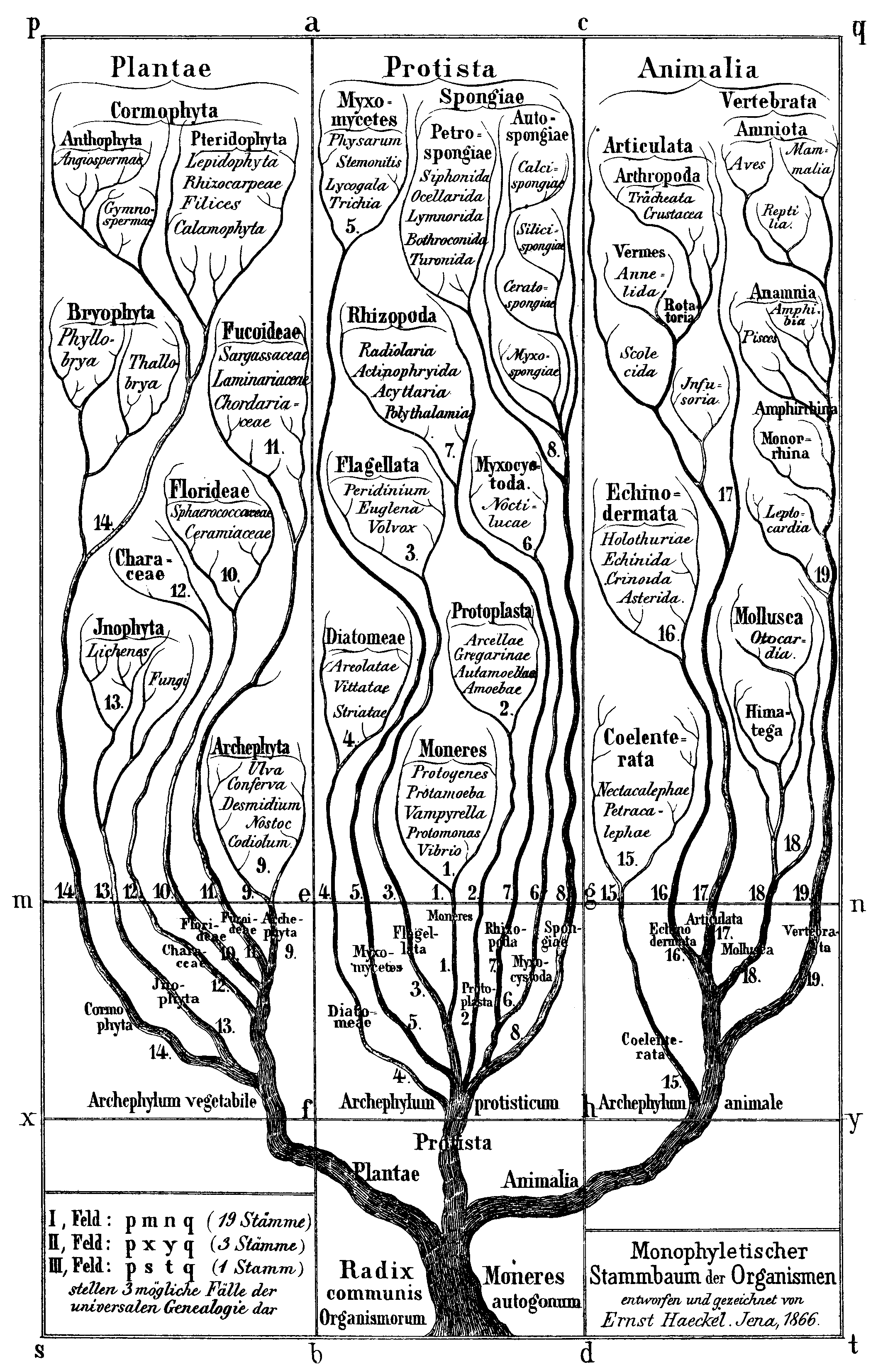
Evolutionary progress as a tree of life. Ernst Haeckel, 1866

Lamarck's two-factor theory involves 1) a complexifying force that drives animal body plans towards higher levels (orthogenesis) creating a ladder of phyla, and 2) an adaptive force that causes animals with a given body plan to adapt to circumstances (use and disuse, inheritance of acquired characteristics), creating a diversity of species and genera. Popular views of Lamarckism only consider an aspect of the adaptive force.

Orthogenesis (Note: Also known as orthogenetic evolution, progressive evolution, evolutionary progress, or progressionism.) is an obsolete biological hypothesis that organisms have an innate tendency to evolve in a definite direction towards some goal (teleology), due to some internal mechanism or "driving force". According to the theory, the largest-scale trends in evolution have an absolute goal such as increasing biological complexity. Prominent historical figures who have championed some form of evolutionary progress include Jean-Baptiste Lamarck, Pierre Teilhard de Chardin, and Henri Bergson.

The term orthogenesis was introduced by Wilhelm Haacke in 1893 and popularized by Theodor Eimer five years later. Proponents of orthogenesis had rejected the theory of natural selection as the organizing mechanism in evolution for a rectilinear (straight-line) model of directed evolution. With the emergence of the modern synthesis, in which genetics was integrated with evolution, orthogenesis and other alternatives to Darwinism were largely abandoned by biologists, but the notion that evolution represents progress is still widely shared; modern supporters include E. O. Wilson and Simon Conway Morris. The evolutionary biologist Ernst Mayr made the term effectively taboo in the journal Nature in 1948, by stating that it implied "some supernatural force". The American paleontologist George Gaylord Simpson (1953) attacked orthogenesis, linking it with vitalism by describing it as "the mysterious inner force". Despite this, many museum displays and textbook illustrations continue to give the impression that evolution is directed.

The philosopher of biology Michael Ruse notes that in popular culture, evolution and progress are synonyms, while the unintentionally misleading image of the March of Progress, from apes to modern humans, has been widely imitated.

== Definition ==
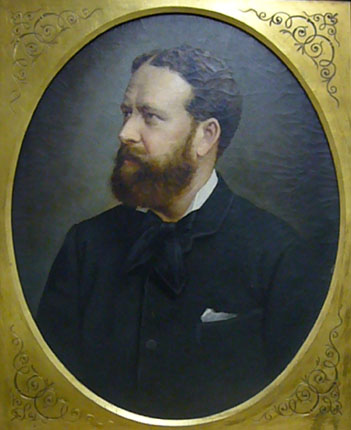
Theodor Eimer was the first to define orthogenesis.

The term orthogenesis (from Ancient Greek: ὀρθός orthós, "straight", and Ancient Greek: γένεσις génesis, "origin") was first used by the biologist Wilhelm Haacke in 1893. Theodor Eimer was the first to give the word a definition; he defined orthogenesis as "the general law according to which evolutionary development takes place in a noticeable direction, above all in specialized groups".

In 1922, the zoologist Michael F. Guyer wrote:

[Orthogenesis] has meant many different things to many different people, ranging from a mystical inner perfecting principle, to merely a general trend in development due to the natural constitutional restrictions of the germinal materials, or to the physical limitations imposed by a narrow environment. In most modern statements of the theory, the idea of continuous and progressive change in one or more characters, due according to some to internal factors, according to others to external causes-evolution in a "straight line" seems to be the central idea.

According to Susan R. Schrepfer in 1983:

Orthogenesis meant literally "straight origins", or "straight line evolution". The term varied in meaning from the overtly vitalistic and theological to the mechanical. It ranged from theories of mystical forces to mere descriptions of a general trend in development due to natural limitations of either the germinal material or the environment ... By 1910, however most who subscribed to orthogenesis hypothesized some physical rather than metaphysical determinant of orderly change.

In 1988, Francisco J. Ayala defined progress as "systematic change in a feature belonging to all the members of a sequence in such a way that posterior members of the sequence exhibit an improvement of that feature". He argued that there are two elements in this definition, directional change and improvement according to some standard. Whether a directional change constitutes an improvement is not a scientific question; therefore Ayala suggested that science should focus on the question of whether there is directional change, without regard to whether the change is "improvement". This may be compared to Stephen Jay Gould's suggestion of "replacing the idea of progress with an operational notion of directionality".

In 1989, Peter J. Bowler defined orthogenesis as:

Literally, the term means evolution in a straight line, generally assumed to be evolution that is held to a regular course by forces internal to the organism. Orthogenesis assumes that variation is not random but is directed towards fixed goals. Selection is thus powerless, and the species is carried automatically in the direction marked out by internal factors controlling variation.

In 1996, Michael Ruse defined orthogenesis as "the view that evolution has a kind of momentum of its own that carries organisms along certain tracks".

== History ==
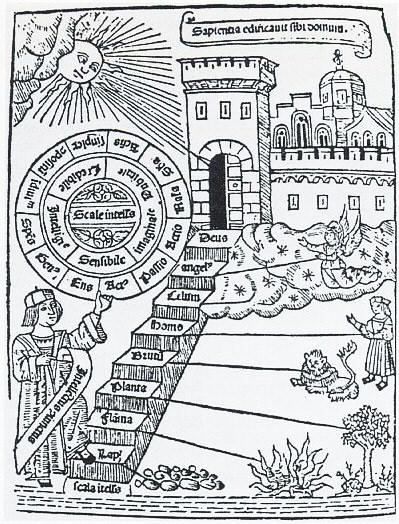
The mediaeval great chain of being as a staircase, implying the possibility of progress: Ramon Lull's Ladder of Ascent and Descent of the Mind, 1305

=== Medieval ===
The possibility of progress is embedded in the mediaeval great chain of being, with a linear sequence of forms from lowest to highest. The concept, indeed, had its roots in Aristotle's biology, from insects that produced only a grub, to fish that laid eggs, and on up to animals with blood and live birth. The medieval chain, as in Ramon Lull's Ladder of Ascent and Descent of the Mind, 1305, added steps or levels above humans, with orders of angels reaching up to God at the top.

=== Pre-Darwinian ===
The orthogenesis hypothesis had a significant following in the 19th century when evolutionary mechanisms such as Lamarckism were being proposed. The French zoologist Jean-Baptiste Lamarck (1744–1829) himself accepted the idea, and it had a central role in his theory of inheritance of acquired characteristics, the hypothesized mechanism of which resembled the "mysterious inner force" of orthogenesis. Orthogenesis was particularly accepted by paleontologists who saw in their fossils a directional change, and in invertebrate paleontology thought there was a gradual and constant directional change. Those who accepted orthogenesis in this way, however, did not necessarily accept that the mechanism that drove orthogenesis was teleological (had a definite goal). Charles Darwin himself rarely used the term "evolution" now so commonly used to describe his theory, because the term was strongly associated with orthogenesis, as had been common usage since at least 1647. His grandfather, the physician and polymath Erasmus Darwin, was both progressionist and vitalist, seeing "the whole cosmos [as] a living thing propelled by an internal vital force" towards "greater perfection". Robert Chambers, in his popular anonymously published 1844 book Vestiges of the Natural History of Creation presented a sweeping narrative account of cosmic transmutation, culminating in the evolution of humanity. Chambers included detailed analysis of the fossil record.

=== With Darwin ===
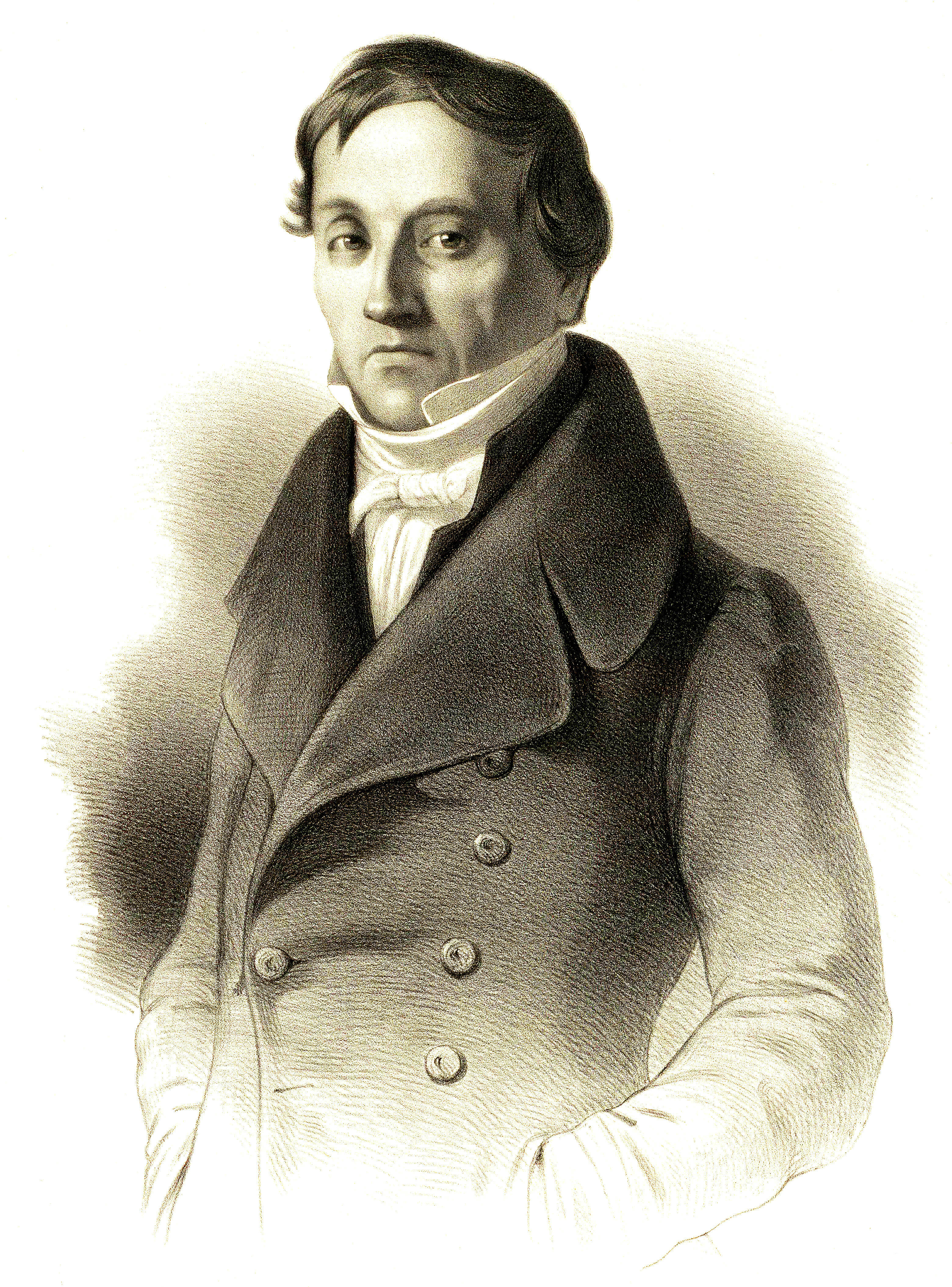
Reviewing Darwin's Origin of Species, Karl Ernst von Baer argued for a directed force guiding evolution.

Ruse observed that "Progress (sic, his capitalisation) became essentially a nineteenth-century belief. It gave meaning to life—it offered inspiration—after the collapse [with Malthus's pessimism and the shock of the French Revolution] of the foundations of the past." The Baltic German biologist Karl Ernst von Baer (1792–1876) argued for an orthogenetic force in nature, reasoning in a review of Darwin's 1859 On the Origin of Species that "Forces which are not directed—so-called blind forces—can never produce order." In 1864, the Swiss anatomist Albert von Kölliker (1817–1905) presented his orthogenetic theory, heterogenesis, arguing for wholly separate lines of descent with no common ancestor. In 1884, the Swiss botanist Carl Nägeli (1817–1891) proposed a version of orthogenesis involving an "inner perfecting principle". Gregor Mendel died that same year; Nägeli, who proposed that an "idioplasm" transmitted inherited characteristics, dissuaded Mendel from continuing to work on plant genetics. According to Nägeli many evolutionary developments were nonadaptive and variation was internally programmed. Charles Darwin saw this as a serious challenge, replying that "There must be some efficient cause for each slight individual difference", but was unable to provide a specific answer without knowledge of genetics. Further, Darwin was himself somewhat progressionist, believing for example that "Man" was "higher" than the barnacles he studied. Darwin indeed wrote in his 1859 Origin of Species:

The inhabitants of each successive period in the world's history have beaten their predecessors in the race for life, and are, insofar, higher in the scale of nature; and this may account for that vague yet ill-defined sentiment, felt by many palaeontologists, that organisation on the whole has progressed. [Chapter 10]

As all the living forms of life are the lineal descendants of those which lived long before the Silurian epoch, we may feel certain that the ordinary succession by generation has never once been broken, and that no cataclysm has desolated the whole world. Hence we may look with some confidence to a secure future of equally inappreciable length. And as natural selection works solely by and for the good of each being, all corporeal and mental endowments will tend to progress towards perfection. [Chapter 14]

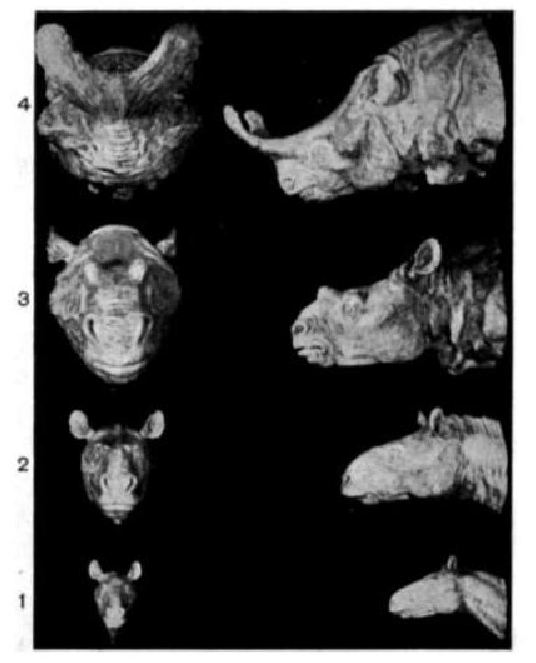
Henry Fairfield Osborn's 1934 version of orthogenesis, aristogenesis, argued that aristogenes, not mutation or natural selection, created all novelty. Osborn supposed that the horns of Titanotheres evolved into a baroque form, way beyond the adaptive optimum.

In 1898, after studying butterfly coloration, Theodor Eimer (1843–1898) introduced the term orthogenesis with a widely read book, On Orthogenesis: And the Impotence of Natural Selection in Species Formation. Eimer claimed there were trends in evolution with no adaptive significance that would be difficult to explain by natural selection. To supporters of orthogenesis, in some cases species could be led by such trends to extinction. Eimer linked orthogenesis to neo-Lamarckism in his 1890 book Organic Evolution as the Result of the Inheritance of Acquired Characteristics According to the Laws of Organic Growth. He used examples such as the evolution of the horse to argue that evolution had proceeded in a regular single direction that was difficult to explain by random variation. Gould described Eimer as a materialist who rejected any vitalist or teleological approach to orthogenesis, arguing that Eimer's criticism of natural selection was common amongst many evolutionists of his generation; they were searching for alternative mechanisms, as they had come to believe that natural selection could not create new species.

=== Nineteenth and twentieth centuries ===
Numerous versions of orthogenesis (see table) have been proposed. Debate centred on whether such theories were scientific, or whether orthogenesis was inherently vitalistic or essentially theological. For example, biologists such as Maynard M. Metcalf (1914), John Merle Coulter (1915), David Starr Jordan (1920) and Charles B. Lipman (1922) claimed evidence for orthogenesis in bacteria, fish populations and plants. In 1950, the German paleontologist Otto Schindewolf argued that variation tends to move in a predetermined direction. He believed this was purely mechanistic, denying any kind of vitalism, but that evolution occurs due to a periodic cycle of evolutionary processes dictated by factors internal to the organism. In 1964 George Gaylord Simpson argued that orthogenetic theories such as those promulgated by Du Noüy and Sinnott were essentially theology rather than biology.

Though evolution is not progressive, it does sometimes proceed in a linear way, reinforcing characteristics in certain lineages, but such examples are entirely consistent with the modern neo-Darwinian theory of evolution. These examples have sometimes been referred to as orthoselection but are not strictly orthogenetic, and simply appear as linear and constant changes because of environmental and molecular constraints on the direction of change. The term orthoselection was first used by Ludwig Hermann Plate, and was incorporated into the modern synthesis by Julian Huxley and Bernard Rensch.

Recent work has supported the mechanism and existence of mutation biased adaptation, meaning that limited local orthogenesis is now seen as possible.

== Theories ==
For the columns for other philosophies of evolution (i.e., combined theories including any of Lamarckism, Mutationism, Natural selection, and Vitalism), "yes" means that person definitely supports the theory; "no" means explicit opposition to the theory; a blank means the matter is apparently not discussed, not part of the theory.

Theories of orthogenesis in evolutionary biology
Author	Title	Field	Date	Lamarck.	Mutat.	Nat. Sel.	Vital.	Features
Lamarck	Inherent progressive tendency	Zoology	1809	yes				In his Philosophie Zoologique, inherent progressive tendency drives organisms continuously towards greater complexity, in separate lineages (phyla), no extinction. ("Lamarckism", use and disuse, and inheritance of acquired characteristics, was a secondary aspect of this, an adaptive force creating species within a phylum.)
Baer	Purposeful creation	Embryology	1859					"Forces which are not directed—so-called blind forces—can never produce order."
Kölliker	Heterogenesis	Anatomy	1864	yes				Wholly separate lines of descent with no common ancestor
Cope	Law of acceleration	Palaeontology	1868	yes				Combined orthogenetic constraints with Lamarckian use and disuse. "On the Origin of Genera"; See also Cope's rule (linear increase in size of species)
Nägeli	Inner perfecting principle	Botany	1884	yes		no		An "idioplasm" transmitted inherited characteristics; many evolutionary developments nonadaptive; variation internally programmed.
Spencer	Progressionism 'The Development Hypothesis'	Social theory	1852	Yes				Cultural value of progress; "Spencer has no rivals when it comes to open, flagrant connections of social Progress with evolutionary progress."—Michael Ruse
Darwin	(concept of higher and lower species), Pangenesis	Evolution	1859	yes		yes		Origin of Species is somewhat progressionist, e.g. man higher than animals, alongside natural selection Pangenesis theory of inheritance by gemmules from all over body was Lamarckian: parents could pass on traits acquired in lifetime.
Haacke	Orthogenesis	Zoology	1893	yes				Accompanied by epimorphism, a tendency to increasing perfection
Eimer	Orthogenesis	Zoology	1898			no		On Orthogenesis: And the Impotence of Natural Selection in Species Formation: trends in evolution with no adaptive significance, claimed hard to explain by natural selection.
Bergson	Elan vital	Philosophy	1907				yes	Creative Evolution
Przibram	Apogenesis	Embryology	1910s					
Plate	Orthoselection or Old-Darwinism	Zoology	1913	yes	yes	yes		Combined theory
Rosa	Hologenesis	Zoology	1918	yes				Hologenesis: a New Theory of Evolution and the Geographical Distribution of Living Beings
Whitman	Orthogenesis	Zoology	1919	no	no	no		Orthogenetic Evolution in Pigeons posthumous
Berg	Nomogenesis	Zoology	1926	no	yes	no		Chemical forces direct evolution, leading to humans
Abel	Trägheitsgesetz (the law of inertia)	Palaeontology	1928					based on Dollo's law of irreversibility of evolution (which can be explained without orthogenesis as a statistical improbability that a path should be exactly reversed)
Lwoff	Physiological degradation	Physiology	1930s–1940s	yes				Directed loss of functions in microorganisms
Beurlen	Orthogenesis	Palaeontology	1930	no		no		Start is random metakinesis, generating variety; then palingenesis (in Beurlen's sense, repeating developmental pathway of ancestors) as mechanism for orthogenesis
Victor Jollos	Directed mutation	Protozoology, Zoology	1931	yes				Combined orthogenesis with Lamarckism (inheriting acquired characteristics after heat shock as dauermodifications, passed on by plasmatic inheritance in the cytoplasm)
Osborn	Aristogenesis	Palaeontology	1934	yes	no	no		
Willis	Differentiation (orthogenesis)	Botany	1942				yes	a force "working upon some definite law that we do not yet comprehend", compromise between special creation and natural selection, driven by large mutations involving chromosome alterations
Noüy	Telefinalism	Biophysics	1947				yes	In book Human Destiny, essentially religious
Vandel	Organicism	Zoology	1949			No		L'Homme et L'Evolution
Sinnott	Telism	Botany	1950				yes	In book Cell and Psyche, essentially religious
Schindewolf	Typostrophism	Palaeontology	1950		yes			Basic Questions in Paleontology: Geologic Time, Organic Evolution and Biological Systematics; evolution due to periodic cycle of processes dictated by factors internal to organism.
Teilhard de Chardin	Directed additivity Omega Point	Palaeontology; Mysticism	1959				yes	The Phenomenon of Man posthumous; combined orthogenesis with non-material vitalist directive force aiming for a supposed "Omega Point" with creation of consciousness. Noosphere concept from Vladimir Vernadsky. Censured by Gaylord Simpson for nonscientific spiritualistic "doubletalk".
Croizat	Biological synthesis Panbiogeography	Botany	1964					mechanistic, caused by developmental constraints or phylogenetic constraints
Lima-de-Faria	Autoevolutionism	Physics, Chemistry	1988	No	No	No	No	Natural selection is immaterial so cannot work.

Multiple explanations have been offered since the 19th century for how evolution took place, given that many scientists initially had objections to natural selection. Many of these theories led (solid blue arrows) to some form of orthogenesis, with or without invoking divine control (dotted blue arrows) directly or indirectly. For example, evolutionists like Edward Drinker Cope believed in a combination of theistic evolution, Lamarckism, vitalism, and orthogenesis, represented by a sequence of arrows on the left of the diagram. The development of modern Darwinism is indicated by dashed orange arrows.

The various alternatives to Darwinian evolution by natural selection were not necessarily mutually exclusive. The evolutionary philosophy of the American palaeontologist Edward Drinker Cope is a case in point. Cope, a religious man, began his career denying the possibility of evolution. In the 1860s, he accepted that evolution could occur, but, influenced by Agassiz, rejected natural selection. Cope accepted instead the theory of recapitulation of evolutionary history during the growth of the embryo - that ontogeny recapitulates phylogeny, which Agassiz believed showed a divine plan leading straight up to man, in a pattern revealed both in embryology and palaeontology. Cope did not go so far, seeing that evolution created a branching tree of forms, as Darwin had suggested. Each evolutionary step was however non-random: the direction was determined in advance and had a regular pattern (orthogenesis), and steps were not adaptive but part of a divine plan (theistic evolution). This left unanswered the question of why each step should occur, and Cope switched his theory to accommodate functional adaptation for each change. Still rejecting natural selection as the cause of adaptation, Cope turned to Lamarckism to provide the force guiding evolution. Finally, Cope supposed that Lamarckian use and disuse operated by causing a vitalist growth-force substance, "bathmism", to be concentrated in the areas of the body being most intensively used; in turn, it made these areas develop at the expense of the rest. Cope's complex set of beliefs thus assembled five evolutionary philosophies: recapitulationism, orthogenesis, theistic evolution, Lamarckism, and vitalism. Other palaeontologists and field naturalists continued to hold beliefs combining orthogenesis and Lamarckism until the modern synthesis in the 1930s.

== Status ==
=== In science ===
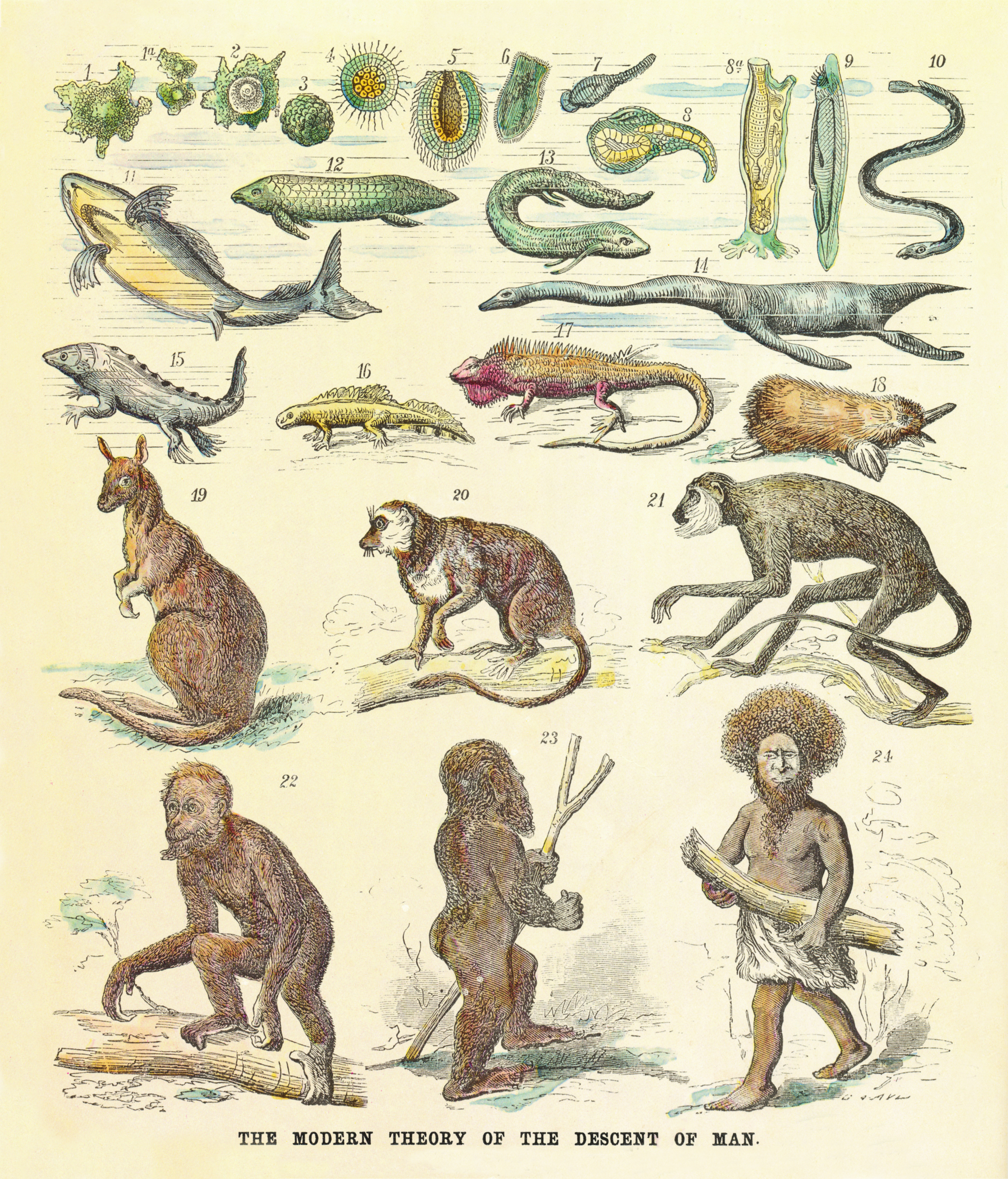
A satirical opinion of Ernst Haeckel's 1874 The modern theory of the descent of man, showing a linear sequence of forms leading up to 'Man'. Illustration by G. Avery for Scientific American, 11 March 1876

The stronger versions of the orthogenetic hypothesis began to lose popularity when it became clear that they were inconsistent with the patterns found by paleontologists in the fossil record, which were non-rectilinear (richly branching) with many complications. The hypothesis was abandoned by mainstream biologists when no mechanism could be found that would account for the process, and the theory of evolution by natural selection came to prevail. The historian of biology Edward J. Larson commented that

At theoretical and philosophical levels, Lamarckism and orthogenesis seemed to solve too many problems to be dismissed out of hand—yet biologists could never reliably document them happening in nature or in the laboratory. Support for both concepts evaporated rapidly once a plausible alternative appeared on the scene.

The modern synthesis of the 1930s and 1940s, in which the genetic mechanisms of evolution were incorporated, appeared to refute the hypothesis for good. As more was understood about these mechanisms it came to be held that there was no naturalistic way in which the newly discovered mechanism of heredity could be far-sighted or have a memory of past trends. Orthogenesis was seen to lie outside the methodological naturalism of the sciences.

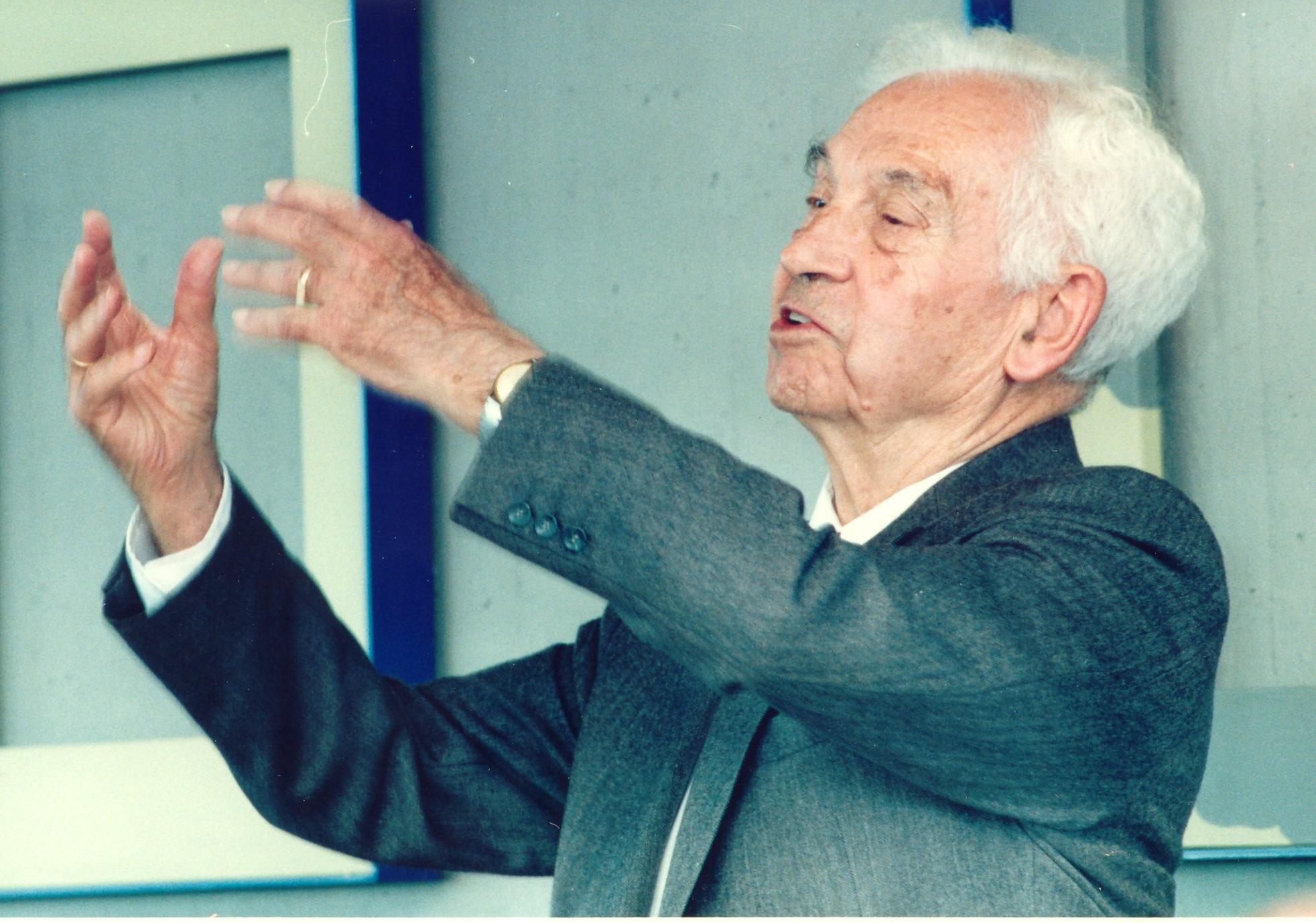
Ernst Mayr considered orthogenesis effectively taboo in 1948.

By 1948, the evolutionary biologist Ernst Mayr, as editor of the journal Evolution, made the use of the term orthogenesis taboo: "It might be well to abstain from use of the word 'orthogenesis' .. since so many of the geneticists seem to be of the opinion that the use of the term implies some supernatural force." For these and other reasons, belief in evolutionary progress has remained "a persistent heresy", among evolutionary biologists including E. O. Wilson and Simon Conway Morris, although often denied or veiled. The philosopher of biology Michael Ruse wrote that "some of the most significant of today's evolutionists are progressionists, and that because of this we find (absolute) progressionism alive and well in their work." He argued that progressionism has harmed the status of evolutionary biology as a mature, professional science. Presentations of evolution remain characteristically progressionist, with humans at the top of the "Tower of Time" in the Smithsonian Institution in Washington D.C., while Scientific American magazine could illustrate the history of life leading progressively from mammals to dinosaurs to primates and finally man. Ruse noted that at the popular level, progress and evolution are simply synonyms, as they were in the nineteenth century, though confidence in the value of cultural and technological progress has declined.

The discipline of evolutionary developmental biology, however, is open to an expanded concept of heredity that incorporates the physics of self-organization. With its rise in the late 20th-early 21st centuries, ideas of constraint and preferred directions of morphological change have made a reappearance in evolutionary theory.

=== In popular culture ===
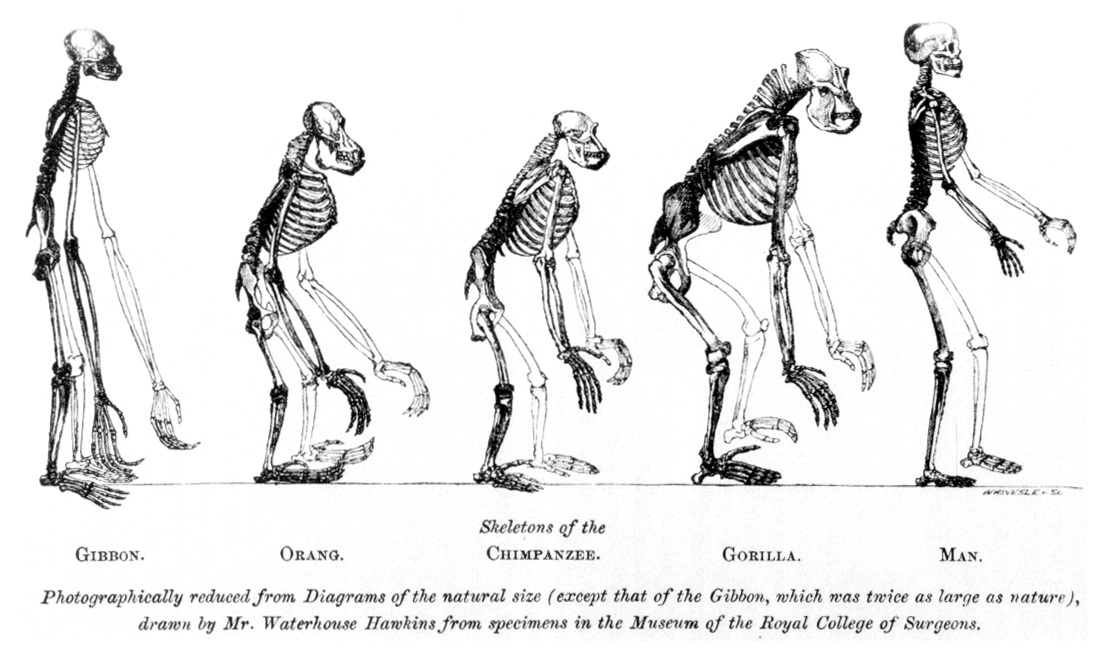
The frontispiece to Thomas Henry Huxley's 1863 Evidence as to Man's Place in Nature was intended to compare the skeletons of apes and humans, but unintentionally created a durable meme of supposed "monkey-to-man" progress.

In popular culture, progressionist images of evolution are widespread. The historian Jennifer Tucker, writing in The Boston Globe, notes that Thomas Henry Huxley's 1863 illustration comparing the skeletons of apes and humans "has become an iconic and instantly recognizable visual shorthand for evolution." She calls its history extraordinary, saying that it is "one of the most intriguing, and most misleading, drawings in the modern history of science." Nobody, Tucker observes, supposes that the "monkey-to-man" sequence accurately depicts Darwinian evolution. The Origin of Species had only one illustration, a diagram showing that random events create a process of branching evolution, a view that Tucker notes is broadly acceptable to modern biologists. But Huxley's image recalled the great chain of being, implying with the force of a visual image a "logical, evenly paced progression" leading up to Homo sapiens, a view denounced by Stephen Jay Gould in Wonderful Life.

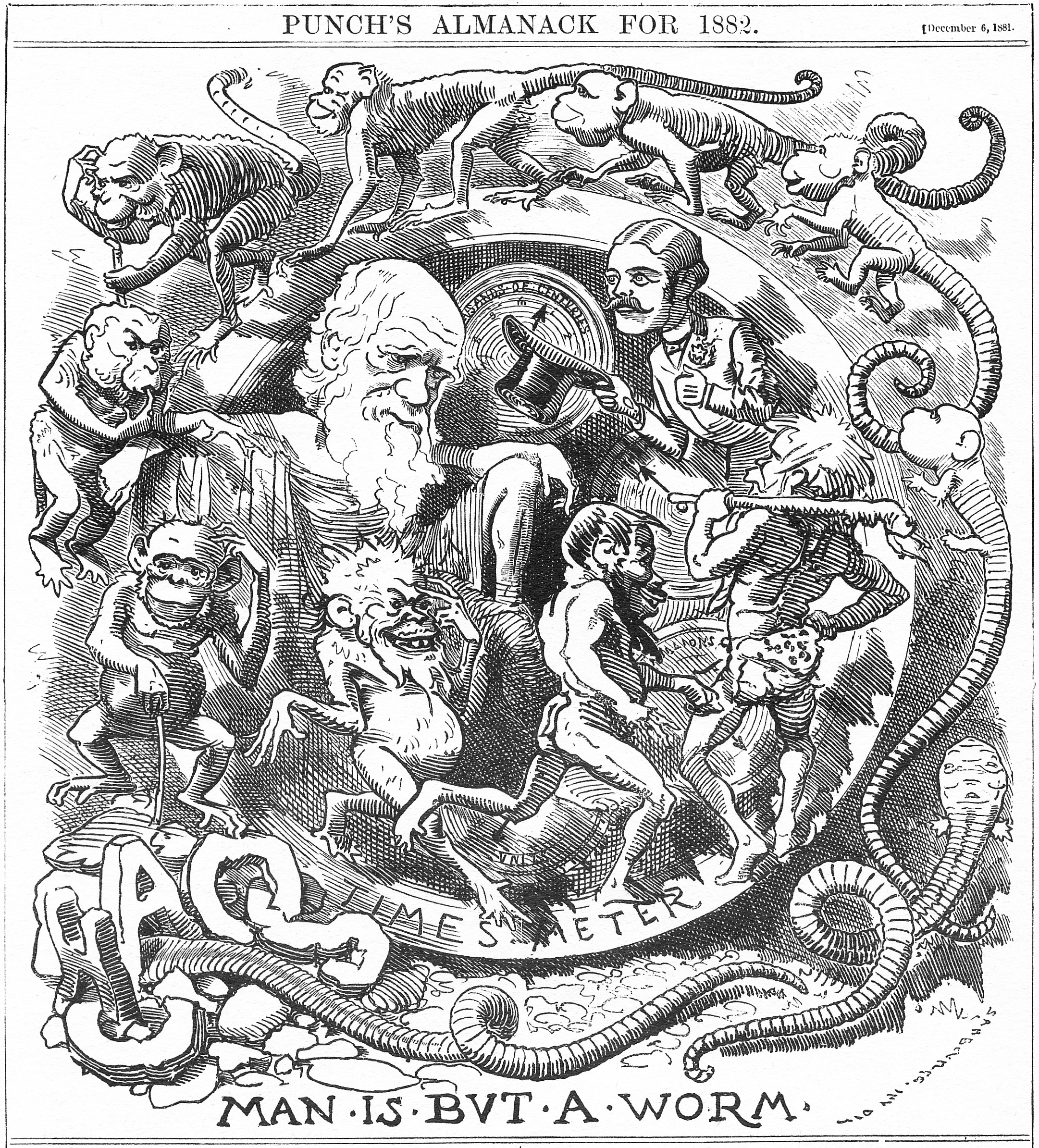
Man is But a Worm by Edward Linley Sambourne, Punch's Almanack for 1882

Popular perception, however, had seized upon the idea of linear progress. Edward Linley Sambourne's Man is But a Worm, drawn for Punch's Almanack, mocked the idea of any evolutionary link between humans and animals, with a sequence from chaos to earthworm to apes, primitive men, a Victorian beau, and Darwin in a pose that according to Tucker recalls Michelangelo's figure of Adam in his fresco adorning the ceiling of the Sistine Chapel. This was followed by a flood of variations on the evolution-as-progress theme, including The New Yorker's 1925 "The Rise and Fall of Man", the sequence running from a chimpanzee to Neanderthal man, Socrates, and finally the lawyer William Jennings Bryan who argued for the anti-evolutionist prosecution in the Scopes Trial on the State of Tennessee law limiting the teaching of evolution. Tucker noted that Rudolph Franz Zallinger's 1965 "The Road to Homo Sapiens" fold-out illustration in F. Clark Howell's Early Man, showing a sequence of 14 walking figures ending with modern man, fitted the palaeoanthropological discoveries "not into a branching Darwinian scheme, but into the framework of the original Huxley diagram." Howell ruefully commented that the "powerful and emotional" graphic had overwhelmed his Darwinian text.

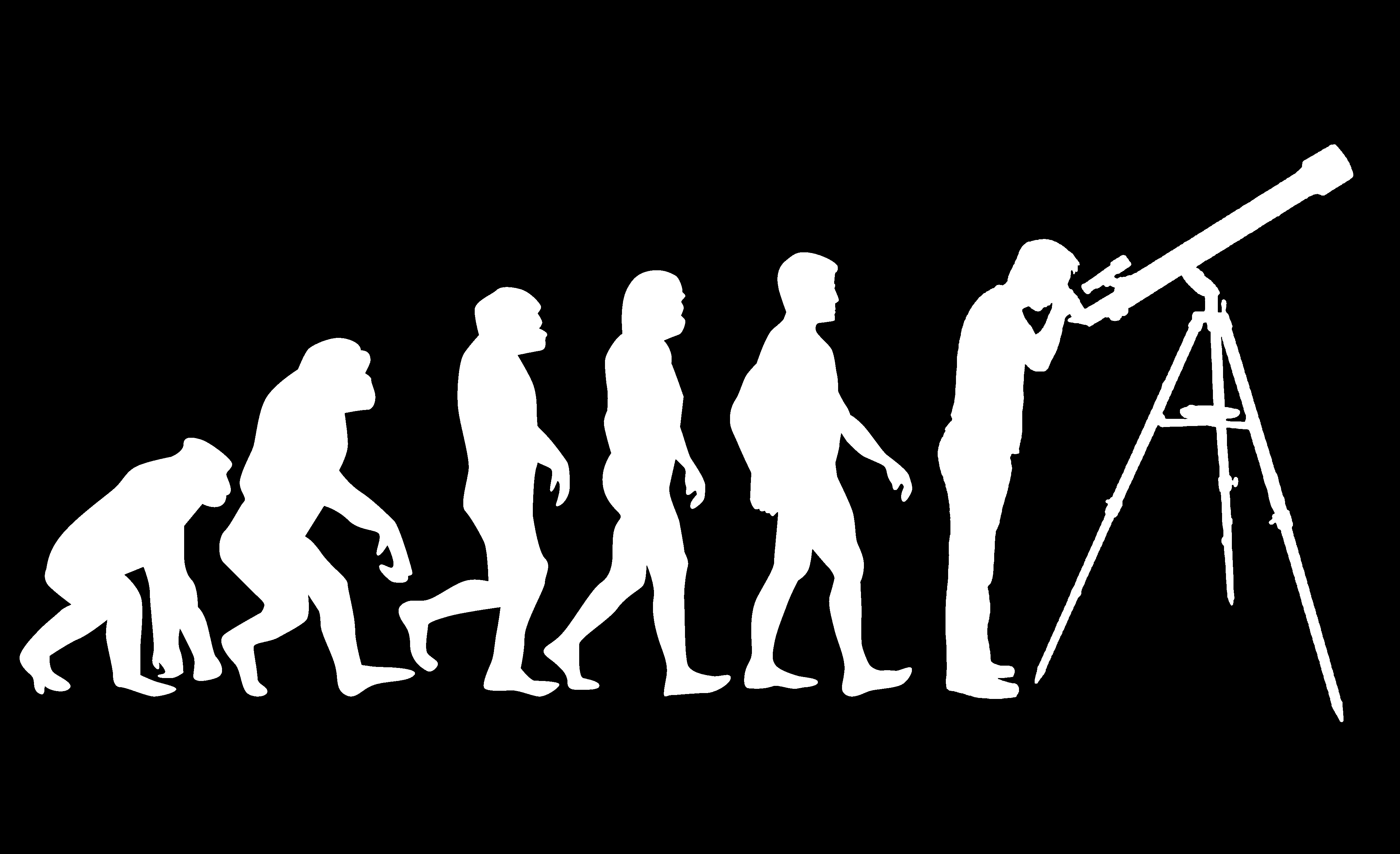
One of many versions of the progressionist meme: Astronomy Evolution 2 artwork by Giuseppe Donatiello, 2016

=== Sliding between meanings ===
Scientists, Ruse argues, continue to slide easily from one notion of progress to another: even committed Darwinians like Richard Dawkins embed the idea of cultural progress in a theory of cultural units, memes, that act much like genes. Dawkins can speak of "progressive rather than random ... trends in evolution". Dawkins and John Krebs deny the "earlier [Darwinian] prejudice" that there is anything "inherently progressive about evolution", but, Ruse argues, the feeling of progress comes from evolutionary arms races which remain in Dawkins's words "by far the most satisfactory explanation for the existence of the advanced and complex machinery that animals and plants possess".

Ruse concludes his detailed analysis of the idea of Progress, meaning a progressionist philosophy, in evolutionary biology by stating that evolutionary thought came out of that philosophy. Before Darwin, Ruse argues, evolution was just a pseudoscience; Darwin made it respectable, but "only as popular science". "There it remained frozen, for nearly another hundred years", until mathematicians such as Fisher provided "both models and status", enabling evolutionary biologists to construct the modern synthesis of the 1930s and 1940s. That made biology a professional science, at the price of ejecting the notion of progress. That, Ruse argues, was a significant cost to "people [biologists] still firmly committed to Progress" as a philosophy.

== Facilitated variation ==
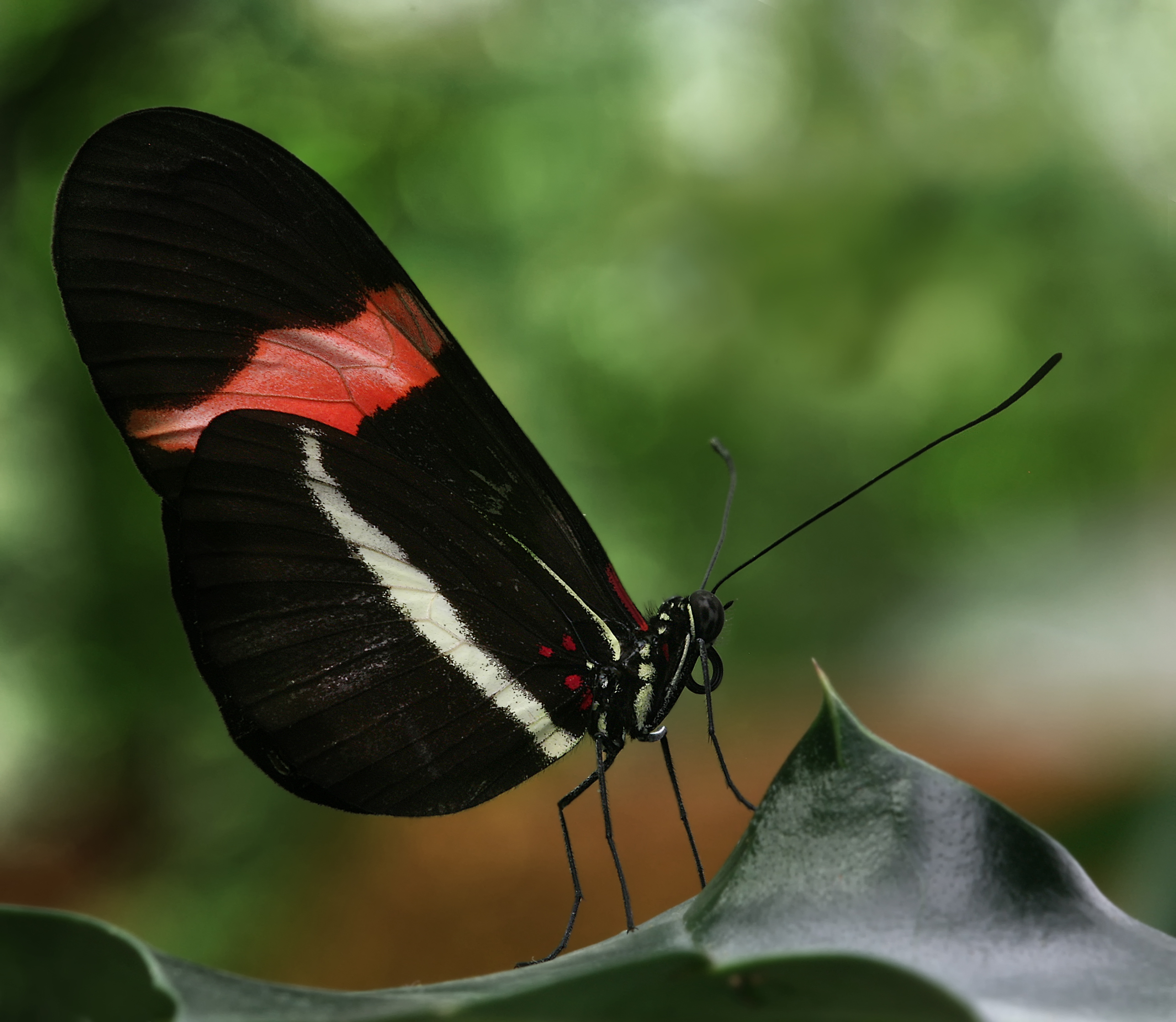
Heliconius erato

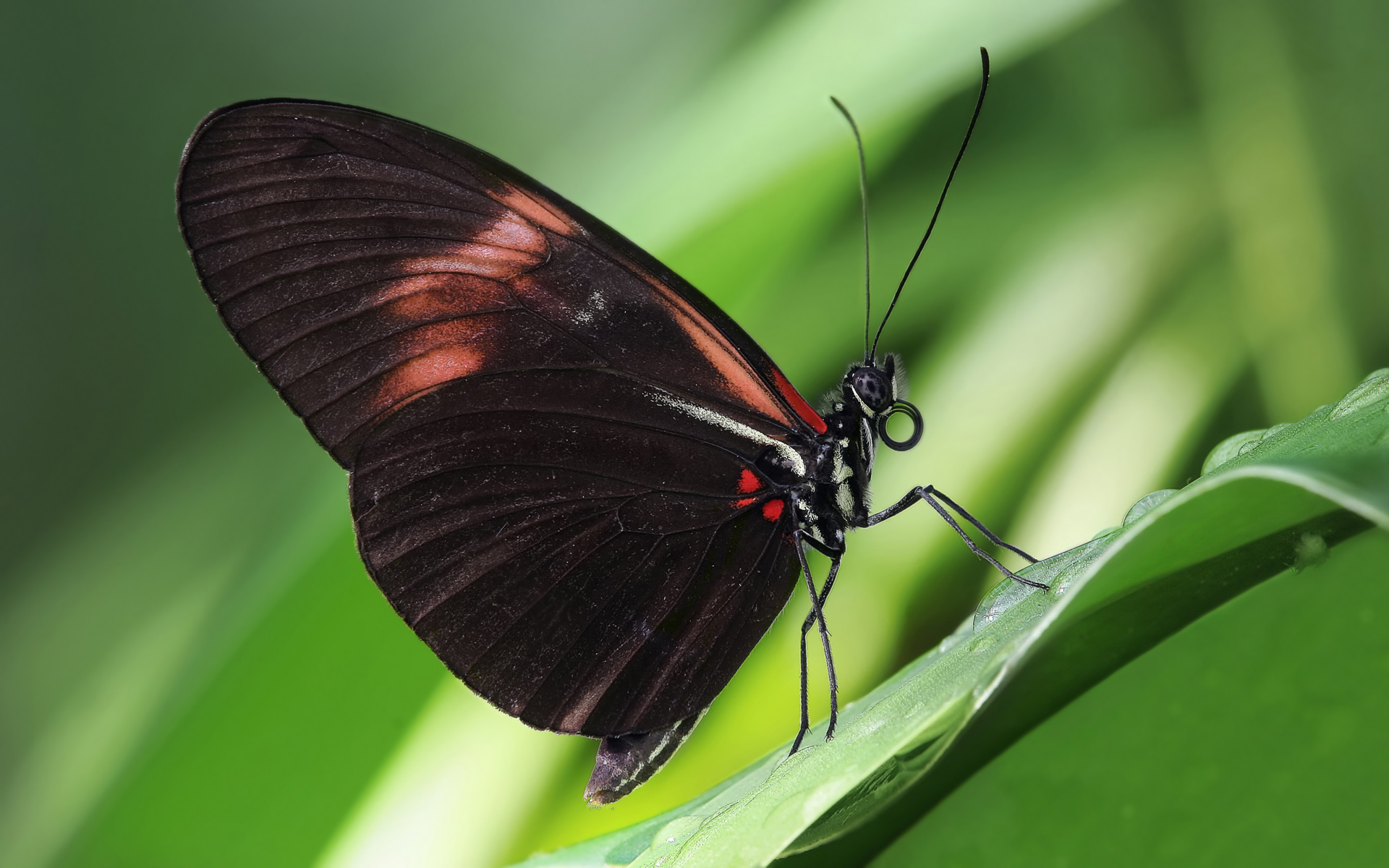
Heliconius melpomene

Different species of Heliconius butterfly have independently evolved similar patterns, apparently both facilitated and constrained by the available developmental-genetic toolkit genes controlling wing pattern formation.

Biology has largely rejected the idea that evolution is guided in any way, but the evolution of some features is indeed facilitated by the genes of the developmental-genetic toolkit studied in evolutionary developmental biology. An example is the development of wing pattern in some species of Heliconius butterfly, which have independently evolved similar patterns. These butterflies are Müllerian mimics of each other, so natural selection is the driving force, but their wing patterns, which arose in separate evolutionary events, are controlled by the same genes.

== See also ==
- Adaptive mutation
- Convergent evolution (contrastable with orthogenesis, not involving teleology)
- Devolution
- Directed evolution (in protein engineering)
- Directed evolution (transhumanism)
- Evolutionism
- Evolution of biological complexity
- History of evolutionary thought
- Structuralism
- Teleonomy
- Teleological argument

== Sources ==
- Bowler, Peter J. (1983). The Eclipse of Darwinism: anti-Darwinian evolutionary theories in the decades around 1900. Johns Hopkins University Press. ISBN 978-0-8018-4391-4.
- Bowler, Peter J. (1989). Evolution: The History of an Idea. University of California Press. ISBN 978-0-520-06385-3.
- Dawkins, Richard (1986). The Blind Watchmaker. Longman. ISBN 978-0-393-31570-7.
- Larson, Edward J. (2004). Evolution. Modern Library. ISBN 978-0-679-64288-6.
- Ruse, Michael (1996). Monad to man: the Concept of Progress in Evolutionary Biology. Harvard University Press. ISBN 978-0-674-03248-4.
