= Schrepfer =

Schrepfer or Schröpfer is a German language occupational surname for a barber-surgeon's assistant (Schröpfer literally means "cupping practitioner", Schröpfen "cupping") and may refer to:

- Johann Georg Schrepfer (1738–1774), German charlatan, independent Freemason and necromancer
- Nikole Schrepfer (1964), Swiss swimmer
- Susan Schrepfer (1941–2014), American environmental historian
