= Sharat Kumar Roy =

American geologist of Indian origin

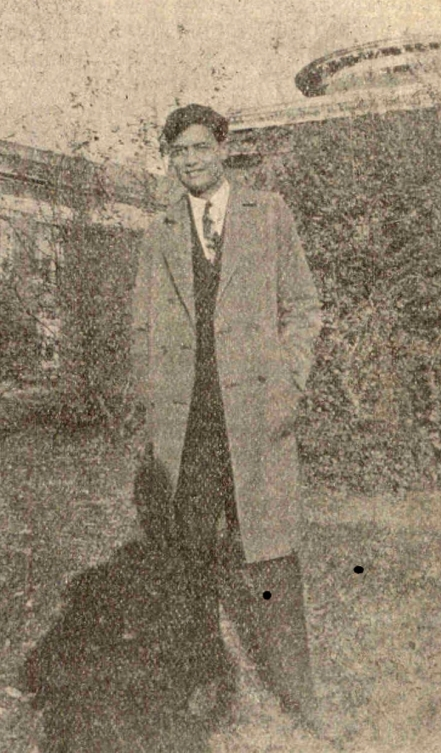

Sharat Kumar Roy (27 August 1897 – 17 April 1962) was an American geologist of Indian origin. He took an interest in volcanoes and later was a specialist on meteorites. He worked as a curator of geology at the Chicago Natural History Museum and took part in several expeditions of the Museum. The United States Coast and Geodetic Survey named a peak on Baffin Island as Mount Sharat after him in 1944.

== Early life ==
Roy was born in an aristocratic Mahishya family in Shyamnagar, Nadia, Bengal where his father Navin Krishna was an engineer. He moved to Hazaribagh with his family where he went to St. Columba's College and then joined Bangabasi College, Calcutta for his pre-university certificate.

== Higher studies and work ==
During World War I, he served in the British Indian Army. He then went to the University of London (1919) along with Raja Bose, son of the geologist Pramatha Nath Bose. He moved to the US and then joined the University of Illinois from where he received a BS (1922) and an MS (1924). He worked for some time in the New York State Museum, Albany before joining the Field Museum of Natural History as an assistant curator of invertebrate paleontology.

Roy joined the Rawson-MacMillan expedition of 1927-28 to Labrador and Baffin Island and collected fossils from Silliman's Fossil Mount and described a number of new fossil taxa. He also became the first person of Indian origin to go on polar expeditions to North Pole. From 1942 to 1946 he served in the US Air force in the India-Burma theatre (posted for a while at Roosevelt Nagar, now called Kalyani, and at Dhubulia, Nadia district) and towards the end of the war, he collected Permian brachiopods and geological specimens from the Salt Range. Returning to the Field Museum, he became a chief curator in 1947. He joined trips to Central America to study volcanoes between 1952 and 1961 with a visit in 1957-58 to Europe and India to examine stony meteorites. He received a PhD from the University of Chicago in 1941. In one of his researches, he replicated the claims made by Charles B. Lipman of finding bacteria inside meteorites and demonstrated that they were only the result of contamination after entry into the earth.

== Personal life and death ==
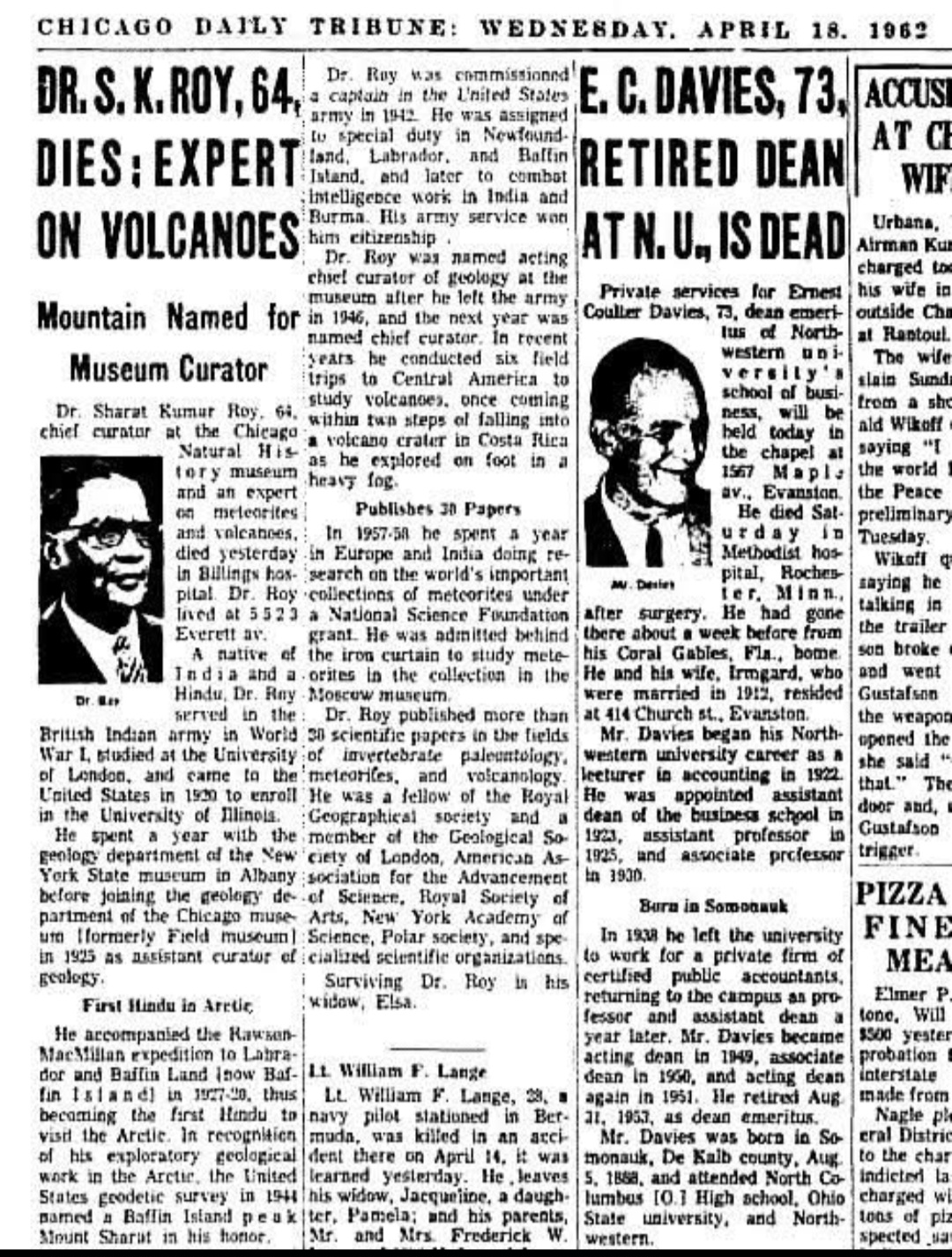
News of his death in the Chicago Daily Tribune

Roy was married to Elsa and lived on South Everett Avenue, Chicago. He died at Billings Hospital. He was a Fellow of the Royal Geographical Society, the Geological Society of London apart from Sigma Xi and Theta epsilon pi.

== Writings ==
Roy published most of his work in publications of the Field Museum (Geological Series):

- 1927. How old fossils. Geology Leaflet 9.
- 1929. Contributions to paleontology. Pub. 254, vol. 4, no. 5.
- 1931. A Silurian worm and associated fauna ( with Croneis, Carey G.). Pub. 298, vol. 4, no. 7, pp. 229–247.
- 1932. Upper Canadian (Beekmantown) drift fossils from Labrador. Pub. 307, vol. 6, no. 2, pp. 29–59.
- 1933. A new Devonian trilobite from southern Illinois. Pub. 327, vol. 6, no. 4, pp. 67–82.
- 1935. A new Silurian phyllopodous crustacean. Vol. 6, no. 9, pp. 141–146.
- 1935. A new Niagaran Conularia. Vol. 6, no. 10, pp. 147–54.
- 1935. A Silurian phyllopod mandible with related notes. Vol. 6, no. 11, pp. 155–160.
- 1937. The Grinnell ice-cap. Vol 7, no. 1, pp. 1–19.
- 1937. The history and petrography of Frobisher’s "gold ore". Pub. 384, vol. 7, no. 2, pp. 21–38.
- 1938. Additional notes on the Grinnell ice-cap. Pub. 434, vol. 7, no. 4, pp. 59–69.
- 1941. The Upper Ordovician fauna of Frobisher Bay, Baffin Island. Mem. vol. 2, pp. 1–212.
- 1949. The Mapleton meteorite (with Robert K. Wyant). Vol. 7, no. 7, pp. 99–111.
- 1949. The Navajo meteorite (with Robert K. Wyant). Vol. 7, no. 8, pp. 113–127.
- 1950. The Smithonia meteorite (with Robert K. Wyant). Vol. 7, no. 9, pp. 129–134.
- 1950. The La Porte meteorite (with Robert K. Wyant). Vol. 7, no. 10, pp. 135–144.
- 1951. The Benld meteorite (with Robert K. Wyant). Vol. 7, no. 11, pp. 145–157.
- 1953. Fresh-water limestone from Torola valley, northeastern El Salvador, Central America. Fieldiana, vol. 10, pp. 173–191.
- 1955. The Paragould meteorite.
- 1957. The present status of the volcanoes of Central America.
- 1957. A restudy of the 1917 eruption of Volcán Boquerón, El Salvador, Central America.
- 1957. The problems of the origin and structure of chondrules in stony meteorites.
- 1962. The Walters meteorite.

A few of his publications were made elsewhere:

- 1929. Columnar structure in limestone: Science n. s., vol. 70, pp. 140–141. doi:10.1126/science.70.1806.140
- 1932. Preparation of microfossils: The Museum Journal (British Museum), vol. 32 pp. 261–266.
- 1934. Memorial of Oliver Cummings Farrington: Geol. Soc. America Proc., pp. 193–210.
- 1953. Polar geology: Polar Engineering Handbook: U. S. Navy, Bur. of Yards and Docks.

He also wrote popular articles:

- 1929. Cruising with the sealers of Newfoundland: Outdoor America (in two parts) 8 pp.
- 1933. The gory saga of the North: Esquire Magazine.
