= Daniele Rosa =

Italian zoologist (1857–1944)

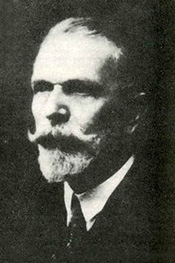
Picture of Italian biologist Daniele Rosa (1857-1944).

Daniele Rosa (1857–1944) was an Italian invertebrate zoologist.

== Biography ==
Rosa was born in Susa, Piedmont. He graduated from the University of Turin. He is most well known for his orthogenetic evolutionary theory known as hologenesis ("ologenesi" in Italian). His theory proposed that evolution is internally driven. Science historian Peter J. Bowler has noted that Rosa's theory of hologenesis was "ignored or dismissed by the supporters of the modern synthesis". His orthogenesis theory is considered to be discredited. However, Rosa contributed valuable research to the fields of biogeography and cladistics. His research influenced the biogeographer Léon Croizat.

== Publications ==
- Ologenesi; Nuova Teoria dell'Evoluzione e della Distribuzione Geografica dei Viventi (1918)
- L'Ologénèse; Nouvelle Théorie de l'Évolution et de la Distribution Géographique des Êtres Vivants (Revised French translation) (1931)

== See also ==
- Rosa's Rule
