= Evolution Without Selection =

Book by A Lima-de-Faria

Evolution without Selection: Form and Function by Autoevolution
- Author: A. Lima-de-Faria
- Subject: Evolution
- Publisher: Elsevier
- Publication date: 1988

Evolution without Selection: Form and Function by Autoevolution is a 1988 book on evolution by cytogeneticist A. Lima-de-Faria.

The book argues that only physical and chemical processes are real and the modern neo-Darwinian population genetics approach to evolution is misguided. Lima-de-Faria emphasizes that the laws of physics and chemistry generate the basic forms found in living organisms, and that physicochemical forces and organisms interact at many levels. The central premise of the book is that the current models of biological evolution such as the modern evolutionary synthesis ignore the active contribution of these forces.

Lima-de-Faria proposes an alternative to the modern evolutionary synthesis known as "autoevolutionism", a form of orthogenesis. He argues in the book that selection is not the mechanism of evolution because it cannot be weighed on a balance, poured into a vial, or measured in specific units. Only a material component can be the mechanism of evolution, and this must be found in the physico-chemical processes.

Lima-de-Faria holds that there are no random events in evolution, there is no natural selection and all living and non-living matter evolve from the same laws. Lima-de-Faria lists 56 principles of "autoevolutionism". He also gives 75 differences between autoevolution and neo-Darwinism. Lima-de-Faria wrote that "In the framework of autoevolutionism, orthogenesis appears as the direct result of the canalization inherent to the evolutions that preceded biological evolution, and as a result of the autonomous evolutions that occur within the cell and the organism."

The book also argues against sexual selection. Lima-de-Faria maintains that the bright colours in certain animals are caused by high temperatures.

== Reception ==
The idea of autoevolutionism has been described as a "minority opinion at the fringes of official circles of thoughts and of the mainstream."

A review by multiple authors in the Origins of Life and Evolution of Biospheres journal noted:

There are a few valid points in A. Lima-de-Faria's Evolution Without Selection Form and Function by Autoevolution but unfortunately they are embedded in the far-fetched examples, illogical progressions and disjointed lists with which the author attempts to demonstrate that evolution occurs not by natural selection but by autoevolution. Lima-de-Faria's major problem with natural selection seems to be that it is not Popperian enough. The term is abstract and the concept is impossible to prove with a controlled scientific experiment; as Lima-de-Faria states it 'Selection cannot be weighed or poured into a vial. As such it is not a component of the mechanism of evolution' (pp. 7, 312). This is a good example of the type of non sequitur that is abundant in this book, in that weighability and pourability are not criteria that come to mind when evaluating theories, nor is autoevolution itself especially weighable or pourable.

Geneticist Austin L. Hughes wrote that the basic idea behind the book "seems to be that there are certain laws of form built into the universe which somehow determine the development of organisms as well as a number of abiotic processes", but the definition of autoevolution was never made clear. He criticized the book noting that "many aspects of biology are discussed in the text, but these discussions are riddled with erroneous and unsupported statements" and concluded that population biology has discredited any theory of orthogenesis.

Historian of biology Igor Popov who has written a book on the history of orthogenesis has commented that the Lima-de-Faria's treatise has "all the drawbacks of theoretical biological treatises such as bulky collections of facts, hasty generalisations, the lack of scientific argumentation and a style which is critical without being creative."

Biologist Gert Korthof has criticized Lima-de-Faria for employing outrageous criteria.
