= Jacob Goodale Lipman =

Professor of agricultural chemistry

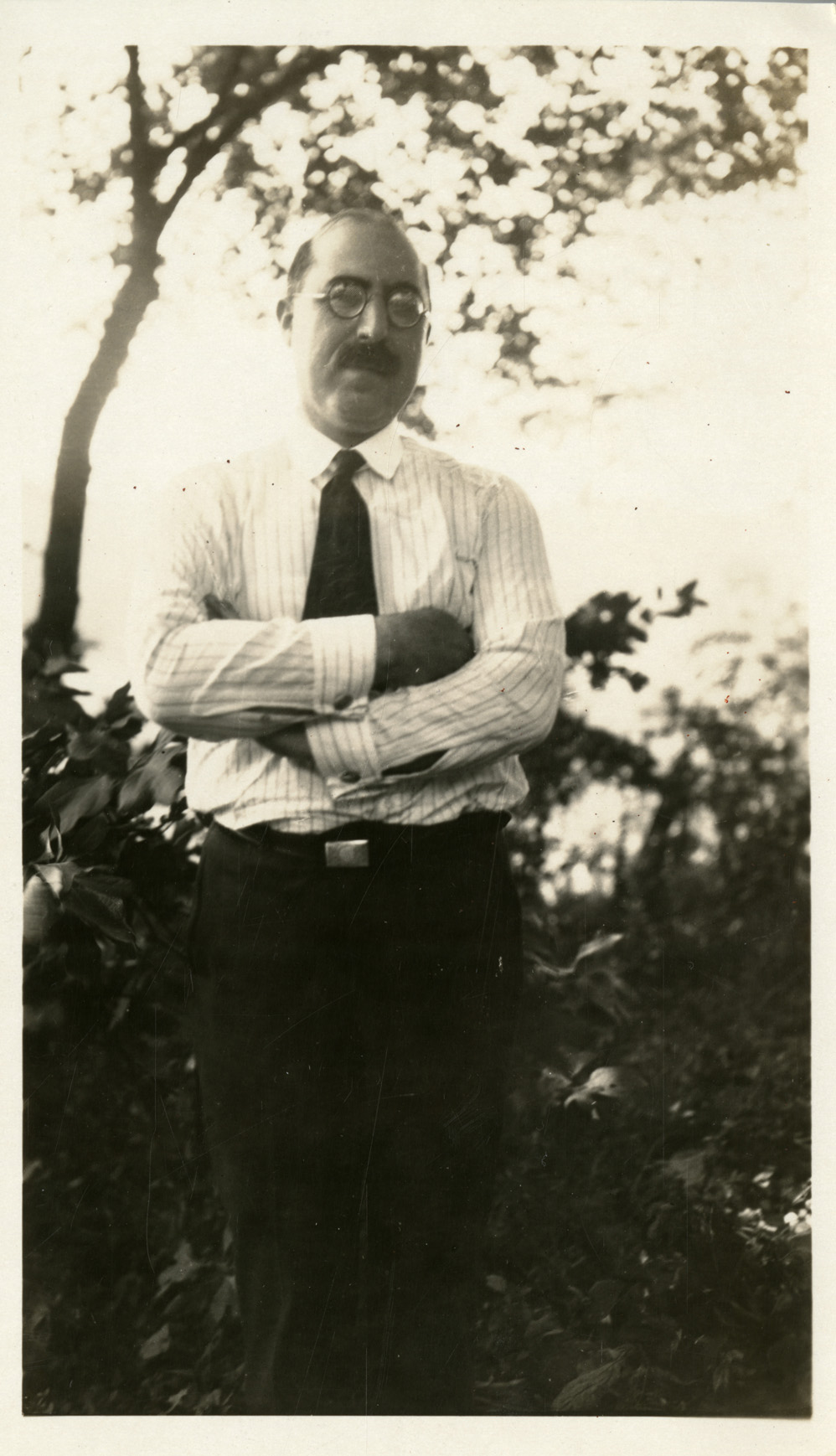
Jacob Goodale Lipman (1874-1939).

Jacob Goodale Lipman (1874, Friedrichstadt, Courland Governorate — 1939, New Brunswick, New Jersey) was a professor of agricultural chemistry and researcher in the fields of soil chemistry and bacteriology.

Lipman was born in Friedrichstadt (now Jaunjelgava in Latvia) on November 18, 1874. Attending school in Moscow, he later attended the gymnasium in Orenburg. He and his family immigrated to the United States in 1888, quickly settling on a farm in Woodbine, New Jersey, where he learned about agriculture. His brother Charles Bernard Lipman would later become a professor of plant physiology. In 1894, he enrolled into Rutgers College to study agricultural science and its founding principles, coming under the influence of E. V. Voorhees. He later attended Cornell University to study advanced chemistry and bacteriology. Lipman was appointed to the Rutgers New Jersey Agricultural Experiment Station in charge of its Department of Soil Chemistry and Bacteriology. Soon afterward, he became an instructor, then professor, of agricultural chemistry at nearby Rutgers College.

Lipman spent his entire career at the Agricultural Experiment Station and Rutgers. In 1911, he became director of the Rutgers New Jersey Agricultural Experiment Station. In 1925, Lipman was one of seven scientists consulted by the defense in the Scopes trial and who supplied an affidavit.

Nobelist Selman Waksman wrote a biography of the researcher, entitled Jacob G. Lipman: agricultural scientist, humanitarian (1966). He quotes Lipman stating: "We are indebted to science for a clearer vision of the great laws of nature and of the methods of the Divine Creator. The men of science, in carrying on their labors in a spirit of reverence and humility, try to interpret the great book of knowledge in order that the paths of man may fell in more pleasant places, and the ways of human society may be better keeping the divine purpose."
