= Jaunjelgava Parish =

Parish in Aizkraukle Municipality, Latvia

- parish of Latvia
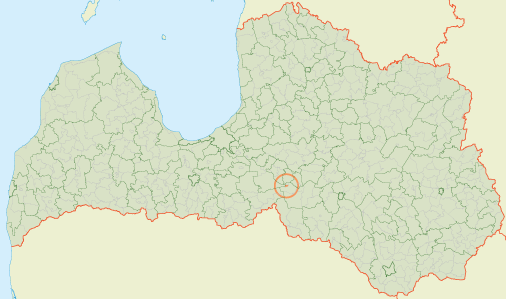
- 56°35′39″N 25°04′17″E
- Country: Latvia

Area
  - Total: 5.24 km^{2} (2.02 sq mi)
  - Land: 5.07 km^{2} (1.96 sq mi)
  - Water: 0.17 km^{2} (0.066 sq mi)

Population (1 January 2025)
  - Total: 71
  - Density: 14/km^{2} (36/sq mi)

Jaunjelgava Parish (Latvian: Jaunjelgavas pagasts) is an administrative unit of Aizkraukle Municipality, Latvia. Its extra-territorial centre is the adjacent town of Jaunjelgava.

Until 2021, it was part of the former Jaunjelgava Municipality. Jaunjelgava Parish was created in 2010 from the countryside territory of Jaunjelgava town.

At the beginning of 2015, the population of the parish was 98. Latvian law defines Jaunjelgava Parish as a part of the region of Selonia.

The town of Jaunjelgava and Jaunjelgava Parish share the same administration.

== Villages and settlements of Jaunjelgava Parish ==
There are no villages or settlements in the parish, as all homes are individual homesteads on the southern outskirts of Jaunjelgava.
