= Rosa's rule =

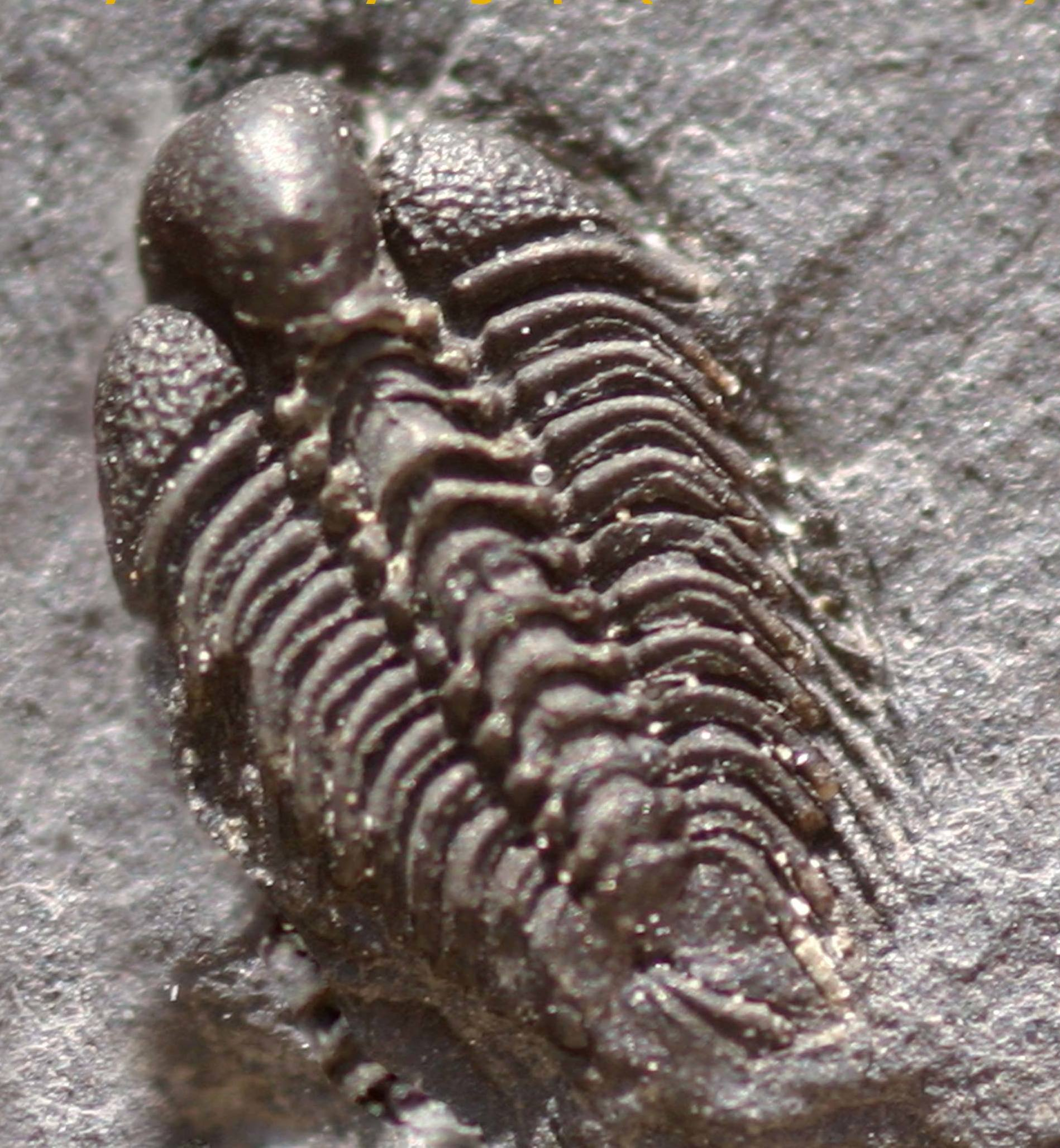
By the Ordovician, trilobites such as Dindymene didymograpti had taken on a fixed number of thoracic segments.

Rosa's rule, also known as Rosa's law of progressive reduction of variability, is a biological rule that observes the tendency to go from character variation in more primitive representatives of a taxonomic group or clade to a fixed character state in more advanced members. An example of Rosa's rule is that the number of thoracic segments in adults (or holaspids) may vary in Cambrian trilobite species, while from the Ordovician the number of thoracic segments is constant in entire genera, families, and even suborders. Thus, a trend of decreasing trait variation between individuals of a taxon as the taxon develops across evolutionary time can be observed. The rule is named for Italian paleontologist Daniele Rosa.
