= Jaunjelgava =

Town in Aizkraukle Municipality, Latvia

- Town
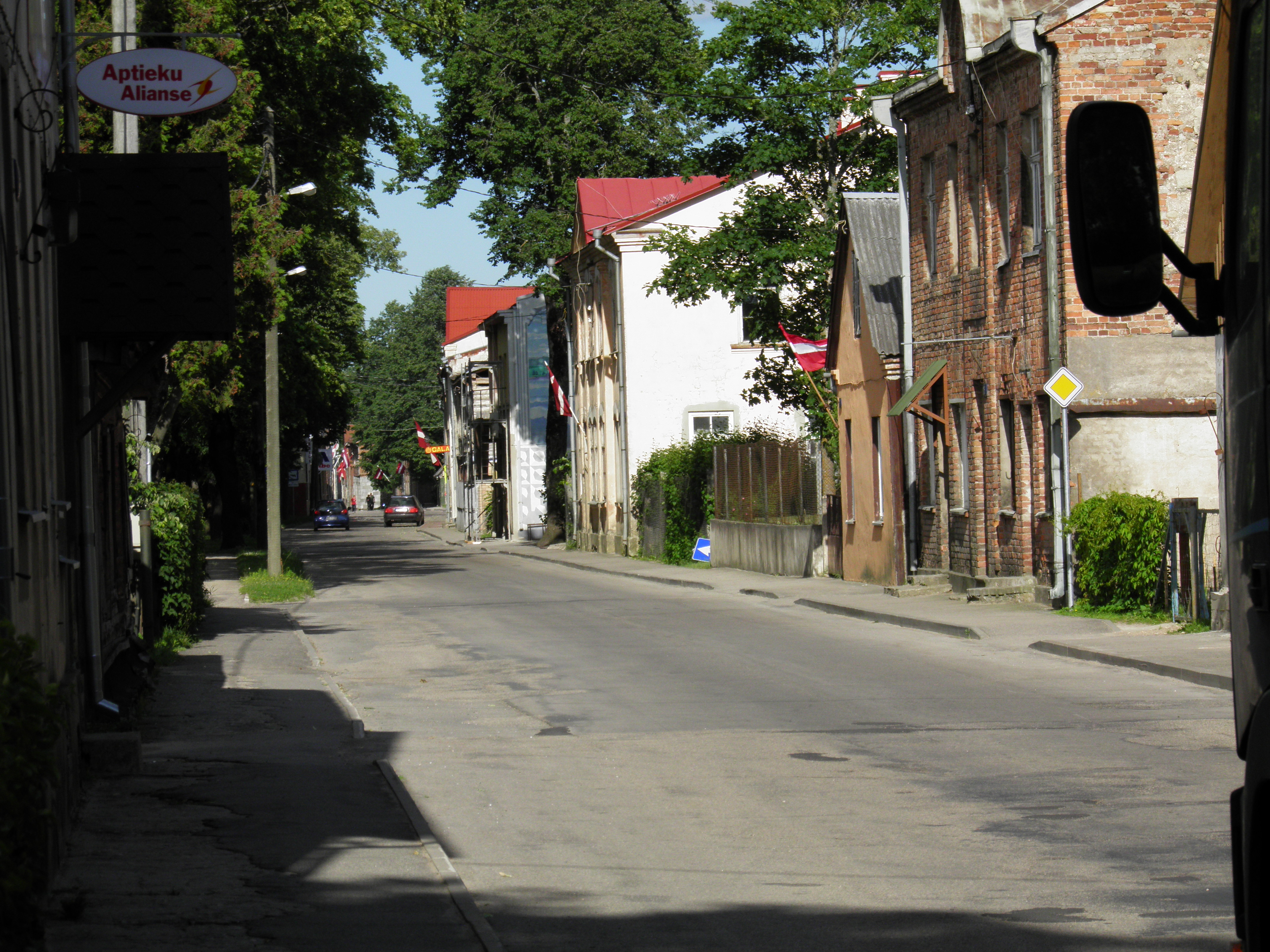

- Coat of arms

- Location in Latvia
- Coordinates: 56°36′N 25°5′E
- Country: Latvia
- Municipality: Aizkraukle Municipality
- Town rights: 1647

Area
  - Total: 6.15 km^{2} (2.37 sq mi)
  - Land: 5.37 km^{2} (2.07 sq mi)
  - Water: 0.78 km^{2} (0.30 sq mi)
  - Rural territory: 5.1 km^{2} (2.0 sq mi)

Population (2026)
  - Total: 1,616
  - Density: 301/km^{2} (779/sq mi)
- Time zone: UTC+2 (EET)
  - Summer (DST): UTC+3 (EEST)
- Postal code: LV-5134
- Calling code: +371 651
- Number of city council members: 9
- Website: http://www.jaunjelgava.lv

Jaunjelgava (literally "New Jelgava"; German: Neustadt; Friedrichstadt) is a town on the left bank of the Daugava River in Aizkraukle Municipality, in the Selonia region of Latvia, about 80 km southeast of Riga. The town The population in 2020 was 1,762.

Jaunjelgava is also the extra-territorial center of the adjacent Jaunjelgava Parish.

== History ==
There is no evidence that territory of a modern Jaunjelgava had been inhabited before 15th century. However, the Selonian Sērene hillfort existed 5 km (3.1 mi) from the modern town. A country estate Vecsērene manor was established around 1450 not far from modern town. During the 15th century the territory of the town was used as a place where merchants from Riga would transport their goods from boats to carriages because, due to the Daugava rapids, it was difficult to navigate further downstream. As a result, a small port emerged.

In 1567 Duke of Courland and Semigallia Gotthard Kettler called the small port Neustadt (German for 'new town'). In 1590 the next Duke Friedrich Kettler founded the town market and granted village rights to Neustadt. At that time about 60 families lived in the town. The village was devastated in 1621, during the Polish-Swedish war. It was re-established as a town in 1646 when Friedrich Kettler's widow Elisabeth Magdalena of Pomerania renamed the town to Friedrichstadt in honour of her husband. In 1647 king of Poland Władysław IV granted town rights and approved the coat of arms of Friedrichstadt.

In 1652 a Lutheran church was built in the town by order of duke Jacob Kettler.

The town saw rapid development in the second half of the 17th century when after Second Northern War town was important transport hub.

In 1710 the plague epidemic started. In 1713 not far from the city, the Russians defeated the Swedes. There were also several large fires during 18th century and a great deal of damage was inflicted by four major floods; the largest was in 1778 when around 100 houses were destroyed. In 1795 Friedrichstadt as a part of the Duchy of Courland and Semigallia was incorporated into the Russian Empire (in the Third Partition of Poland) and became part of the Courland Governorate. During Napoleon's 1812 invasion in Russia several small battles were fought around the town. In 1831 and 1848 cholera, raged. During the first half of the 19th century the town prospered thanks to merchant activities. Local inhabitants owned warehouses, taverns for rafters and were involved in transportation of goods by carriage to Jakobstadt. In 1820 there were 24 taverns in the town.

After the opening of the Riga–Daugavpils Railway line in 1861, the Daugava River waterway, and thus the city, lost its importance. However in the late 19th century there were still around 10 banks and various insurance offices, 60 merchant enterprises, 23 industrial enterprises and a hospital in the town. In 1909 telephone connection was established between Friedrichstadt, Riga and Jelgava. In 1914 the city had 7,300 inhabitants.

Jaunjelgava saw heavy destruction during World War I when it was a frontline settlement for several years. The town also was heavily damaged when from 17 October to 15 November 1919 heavy fighting took place near the city during the Latvian War of Independence. At the conclusion of the battle the town was liberated from the West Russian Volunteer Army by the Latvian army. In 1925 the city had only 1577 inhabitants. During the Republic of Latvia the town was renamed Jaunjelgava (literary: New Jelgava). In the 1930s a 3.5 km (2.2 mi) long and 3 m (9.8 ft) tall dam was constructed to protect the town from floods.

During World War II, Jaunjelgava was under Soviet occupation from 1940, and then under German occupation from 1 July 1941 until 18 September 1944. It was administered as a part of the Generalbezirk Lettland of Reichskommissariat Ostland.

== Notable residents ==
- Jacob Goodale Lipman (1874-1939) - Chemist and professor of agricultural chemistry.
- Herman Rosenthal (1843 - 1917) - American author, editor, and librarian.

== Shtetl ==
Jaunjelgava was one of many shtetls which once existed in the Pale of Settlement. Its Jewish community was established toward the close of the seventeenth century. In 1858 first Jewish school was opened in the town. In 1897, 3,800 of its population of 5,223 were Jews. By 1935, only 25% of the city's population was Jewish. Some of them were deported in June 1941, and some were murdered in the Holocaust when on 2 August German troops liquidated the city's Jewish community.

== Jaunjelgava municipality ==
In 2009 the city joined six surrounding communities to form a local government district. (See also: Administrative divisions of Latvia)

== Selected publications ==
- Heinz zur Mühlen: Baltisches historisches Ortslexikon, Tl. 2, Lettland (Südlivland und Kurland), ISBN 978-3-41206-889-9
- Latvijas Pagastu Enciklopēdeija, 2002, ISBN 9984-00-436-8
- Friedrichstadt entry in the Jewish Encyclopedia

== See also ==
- List of cities in Latvia

== Gallery ==
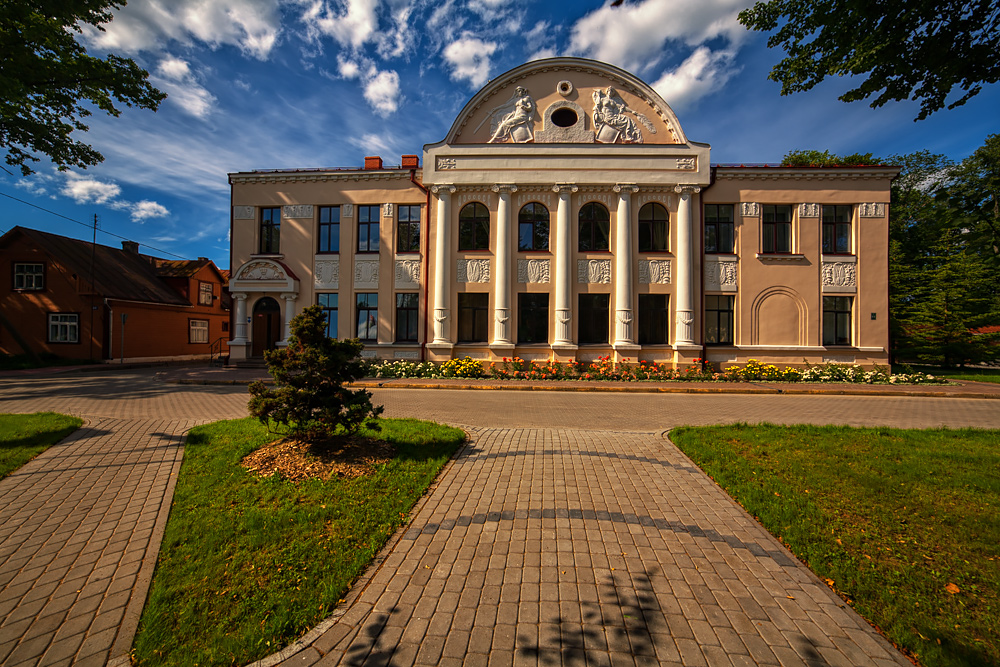
Jaunjelgava town hall

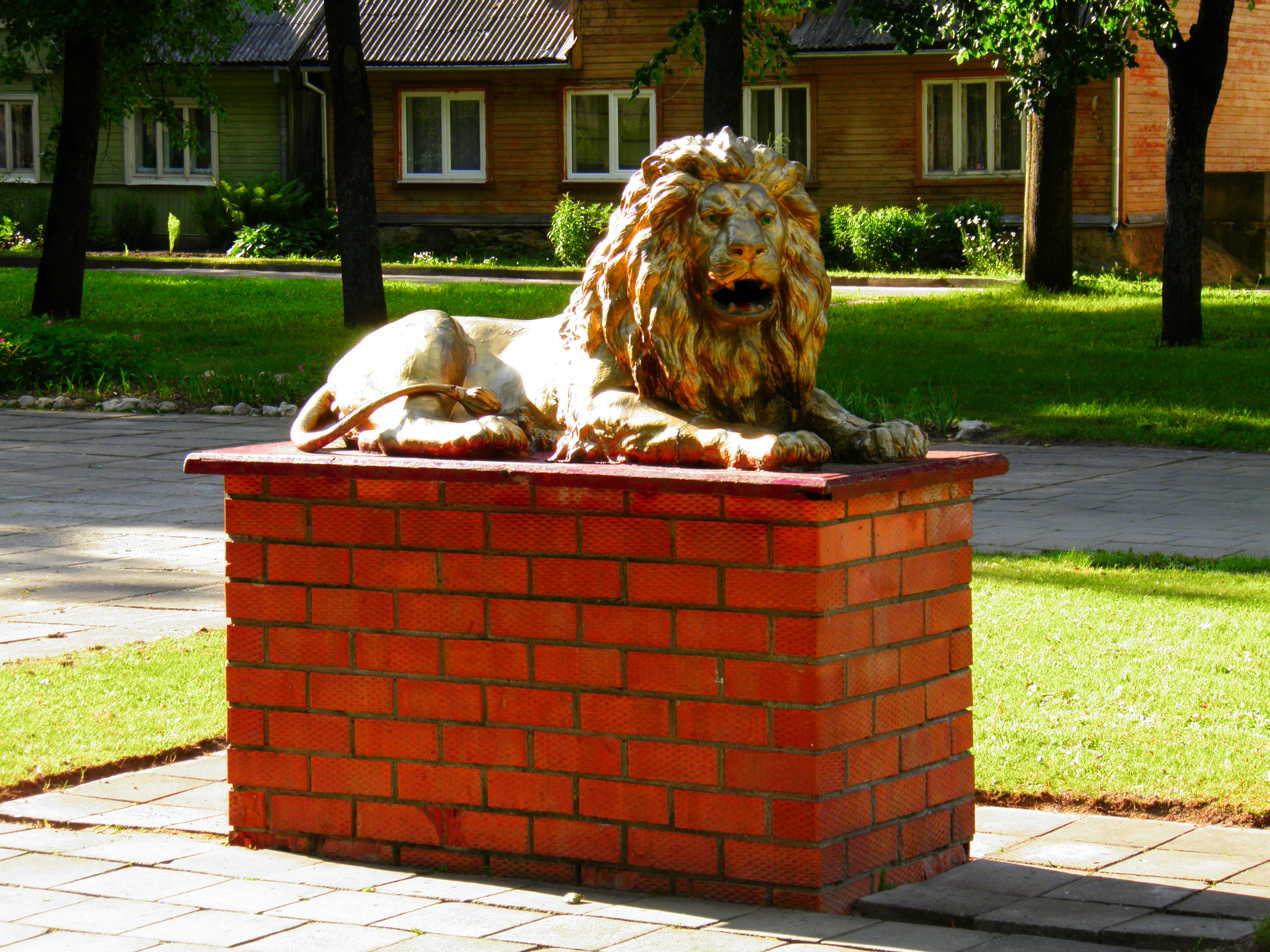
Sculpture of a lion, the symbol of Jaunjelgava

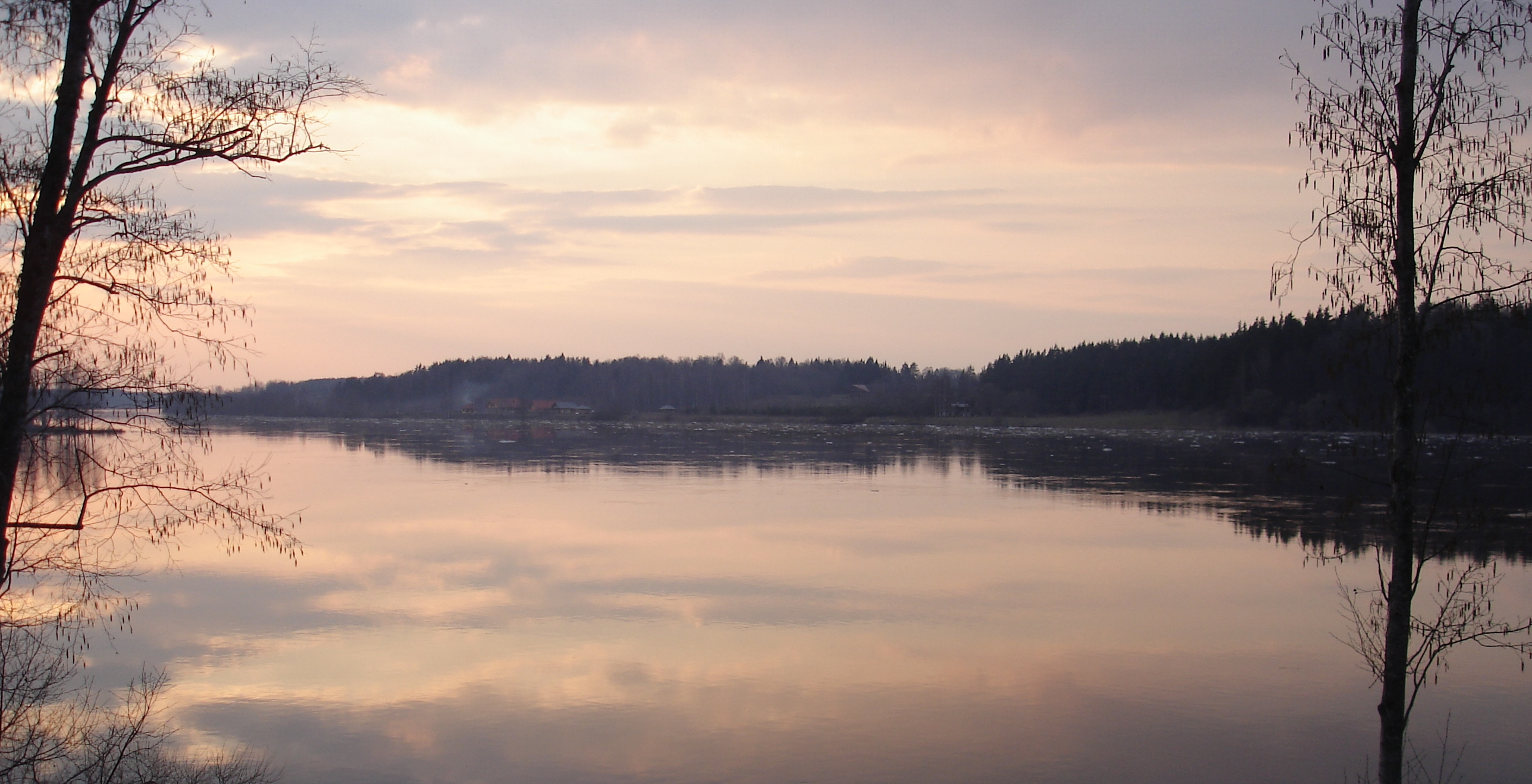
Daugava River

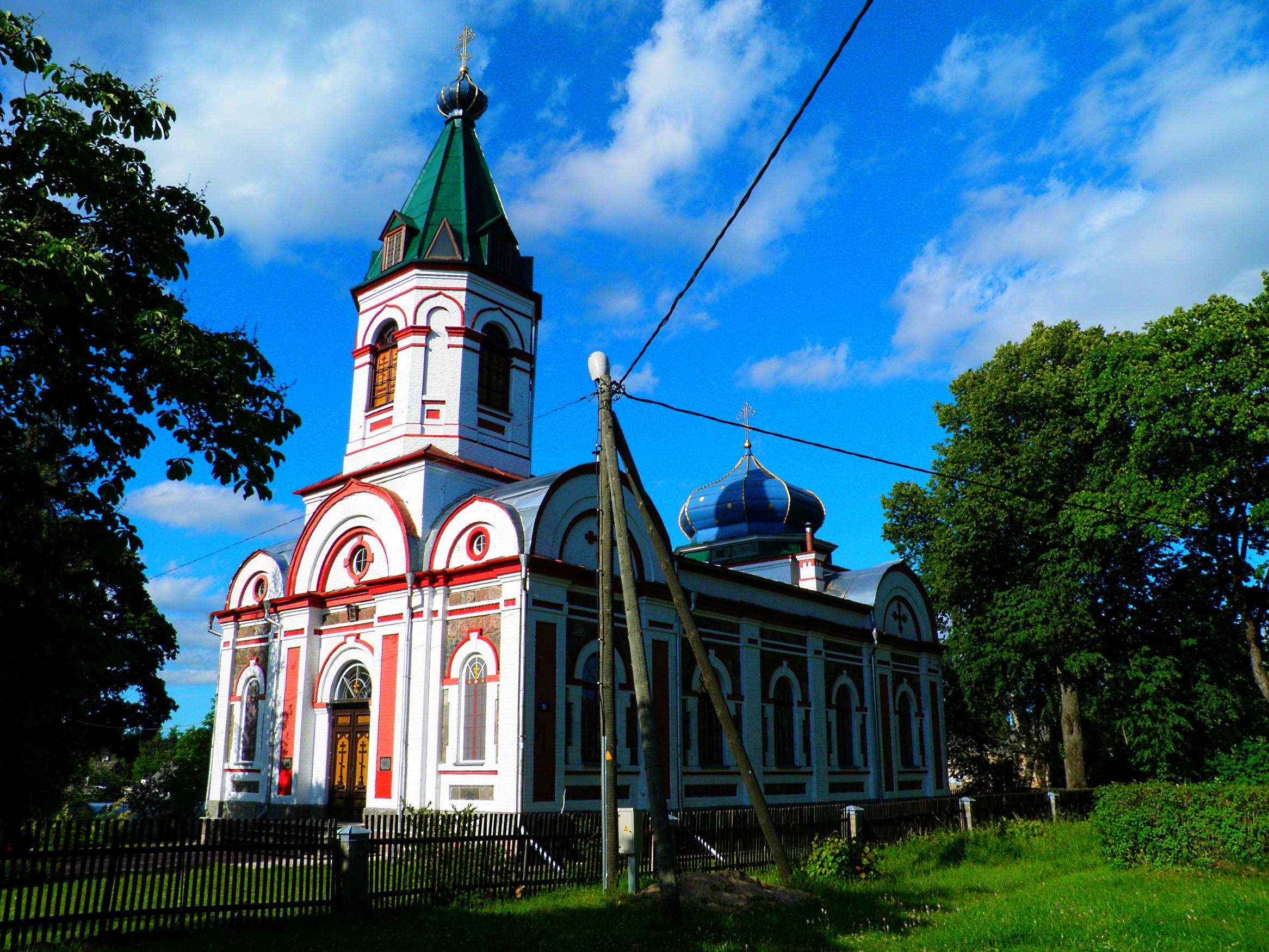
Jaunjelgava's Orthodox church

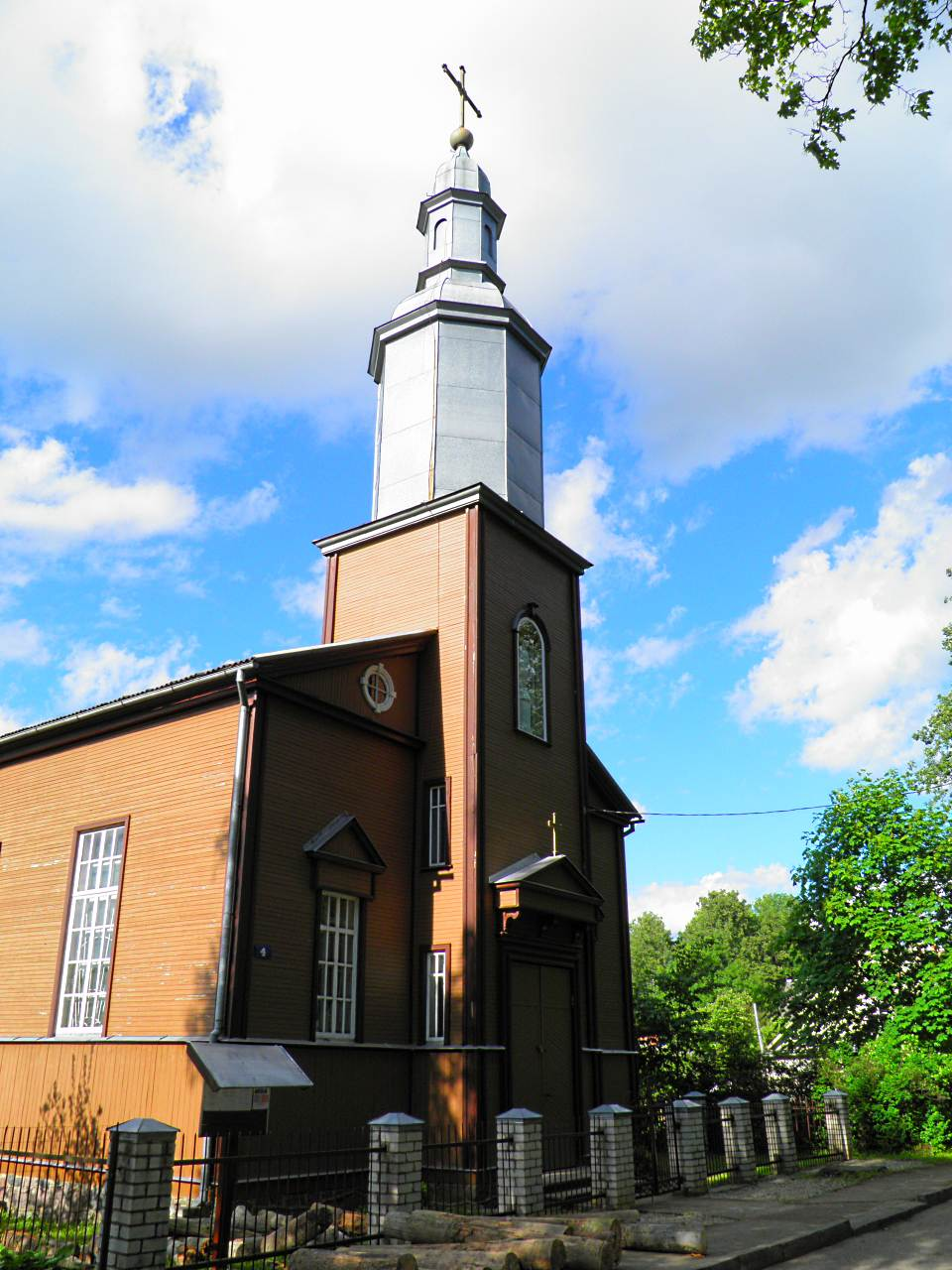
Jaunjelgava's Catholic church

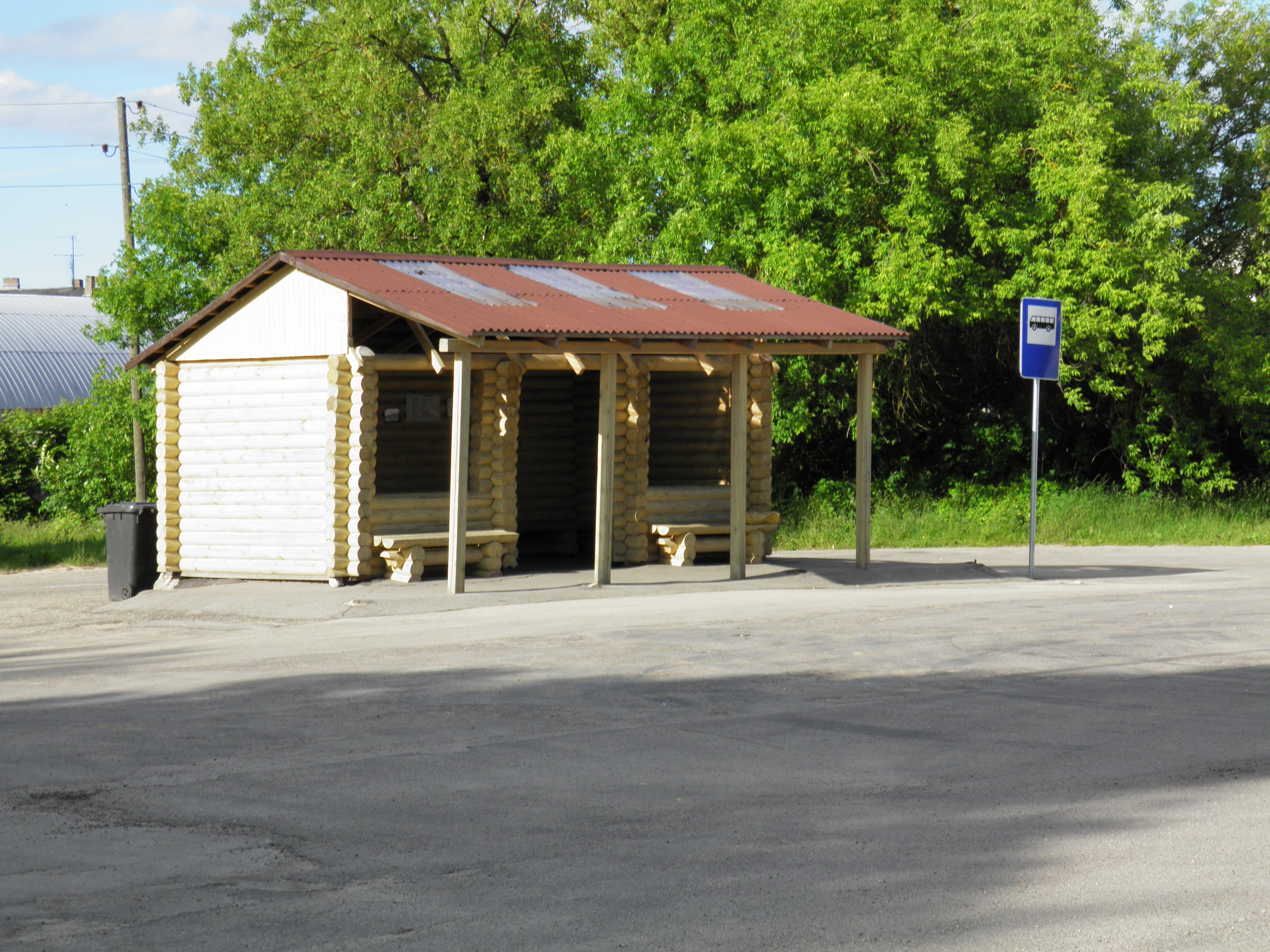
Bus stop
