= Susan Schrepfer =

American environmental historian

Susan Rita Schrepfer (1941–2014) was an American environmental historian.

== Life ==
Susan Schrepfer was born in San Francisco in 1941, and grew up in Gilroy, California. After graduating from high school in Gilroy, she worked as a farm labourer before studying history at the University of California, Santa Barbara, receiving her AB in 1963. She gained an MA (1965) and a PhD in history at the University of California, Riverside.

As a researcher at the Forest History Society, Schrepfer combined archival research and oral history to reconstruct the differing priorities of environmentalists, scientists and timber industry executives in nineteenth- and twentieth-century America. In 1974 she joined Rutgers University as an assistant professor of history. She revised her PhD dissertation, publishing it as The Fight to Save the Redwoods (1983), winning the Forest History Society's Biennial Book Award. In 1988 she helped found the Rutgers Institute for High School Teachers, a collaboration between the state university's history faculty and New Jersey's school teachers.

In 2005 she published Nature's Altars, praised by one reviewer as "the best monograph in US environmental history yet to appear to use gender as its central category of analysis”. Diagnosed with pancreatic cancer, she was given only months to live in 2008. She died on March 3, 2014. She is survived by her daughter, Amy, and step-daughter, Cecilia. She was predeceased by her partner, Edward Ortiz.

== Works ==
- (with Edwin van Horn Larson and Elwood R. Maunder) A history of the Northeastern Forest Experiment Station, 1923 to 1973. Upper Darby, PA.: Forest Service, 1973.
- The fight to save the redwoods: a history of environmental reform, 1917-1978. Madison, Wis.: University of Wisconsin Press, 1983.
- (ed, with Philip Scranton) Industrializing organisms: introducing evolutionary history. New York: Routledge, 2003
- Nature's altars: mountains, gender, and American environmentalism. Lawrence, Kan.: University Press of Kansas, 2005
