= Charles B. Lipman =

Russian-born American microbiologist and professor

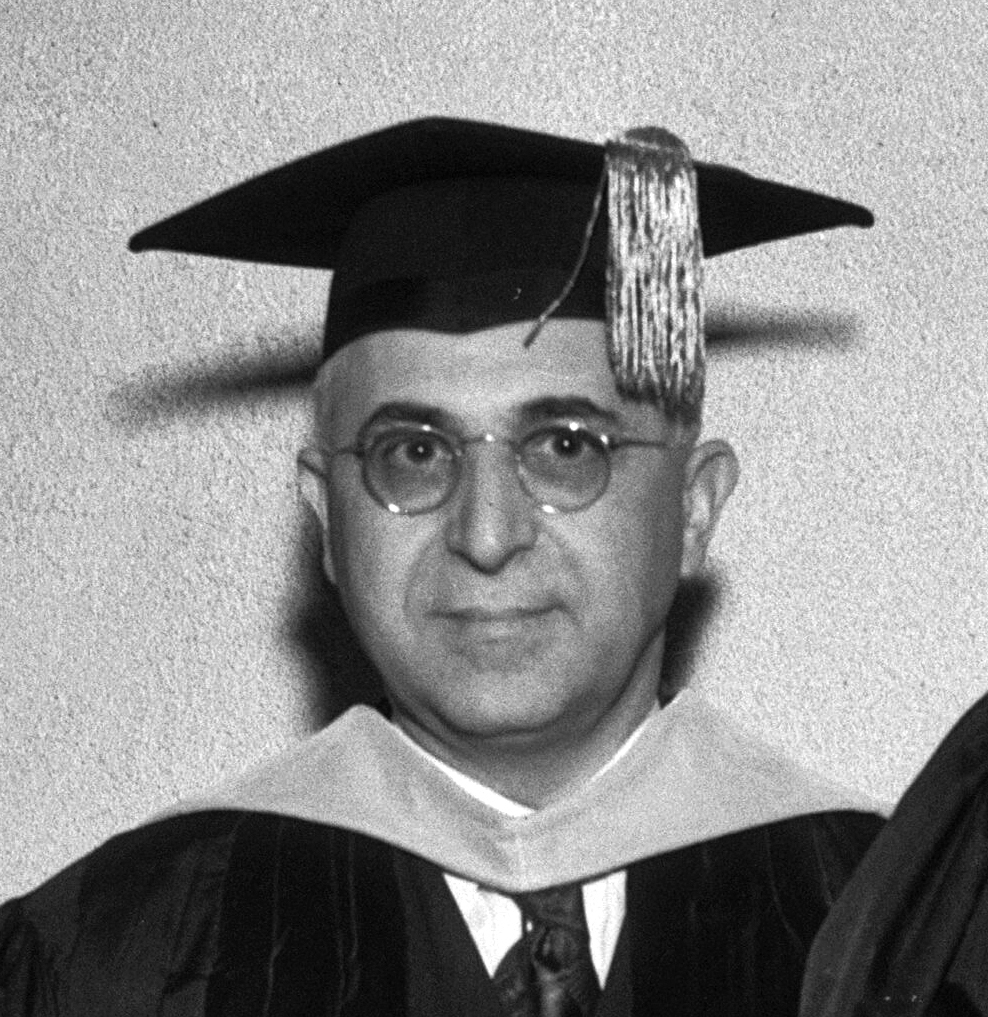
Lipman in 1936

Charles Bernard Lipman (17 April 1883 – 22 October 1944) was a Russian-born American microbiologist and professor of plant physiology at the University of California, Berkeley. He was a proponent of the idea of cosmic seeding and claimed evidence of meteorites carrying micro-organisms, although replication of his experiments showed that his results were due to contamination.

Lipman was born in Moscow, Russia and had moved to the United States at the age of six with his brother. Growing up working in a farm, he was able to support his education. He received a BS and MS from Rutgers and received a second MS from the University of Wisconsin. A Goewey Fellowship allowed him to work on his PhD at the University of California. He then joined the University in 1909 working with E. W. Hilgard on soil bacteria. His brother Jacob G. Lipman also took an interest in bacteriology and became a professor at Rutgers University. Lipman became a professor of plant physiology in 1925 and worked on nitrogen fixation and work on agriculture in arid soils. He found that bacteria were found in very dry soils and began to examine their presence in rocks. He claimed that he had found bacteria within coal, however it was demonstrated that these were only due to fissures and cracks into which bacteria had entered. He found that igneous rocks did not have bacteria within them. He claimed that stony meteorites had bacteria even after their surfaces had been sterilized and the material broken down, but this was again shown to be due to contamination.
