= Ravi Allada =

Indian-American chronobiologist

Ravi Allada, M.D.
- Education: University of Michigan (B.S.) University of Michigan (M.D.)
- Awards: Burroughs Wellcome Career Award in the Biomedical Sciences (1999-2003); National Alliance for Research on Schizophrenia and Depression Young Investigator Award (2003-2005); Distinguished Service Award, Society for Research on Biological Rhythms(2008); Edward C. Stuntz Distinguished Professorship in Neuroscience (2016) Executive Director, Michigan Neuroscience Institute and Theophile Raphael, M.D., Collegiate Professor of Neurosciences (2023)
- Scientific career
- Fields: Chronobiology; Neurobiology
- Workplaces: Brigham and Women's Hospital; Brandeis University; Northwestern University University of Michigan
- Academic advisors: Howard Nash Carl Wu Michael Rosbash
- Website: https://medicine.umich.edu/dept/mni/ravi-allada-md

Ravi Allada (born 1967) is an Indian-American chronobiologist studying the circadian and homeostatic regulation of sleep primarily in the fruit fly Drosophila. He is currently the executive director of the Michigan Neuroscience Institute (MNI), a collective which connects neuroscience investigators across the University of Michigan to probe the mysteries of the brain on a cellular, molecular, and behavioral level. Working with Michael Rosbash, he positionally cloned the Drosophila Clock gene. In his laboratory at Northwestern, he discovered a conserved mechanism for circadian control of sleep-wake cycle, as well as circuit mechanisms that manage levels of sleep.

== Early life ==
Allada was born on August 20, 1967, in Midland, Michigan, to Indian immigrant parents, Sambasiva Rao and Jayalakshmi. Allada has two brothers, Vivek and Gopal, who both currently work as physicians. At the age of 11, Allada won 3rd place in a free throw competition. Allada's interest in sports also led him to track baseball statistics, which triggered Ravi Allada's interest in math and later, his research on jet lag for MLB players.

== Education ==
Allada graduated from H. H. Dow High School in 1985. Following high school, Allada attended the University of Michigan where he was awarded his B.S. degree.

Allada was also awarded his M.D. by the University of Michigan. While attending University of Michigan Medical School, Allada spent two years as an HHMI-NIH Research Scholar working with Howard Nash on a molecular genetics project relating to general anesthesia in Drosophila. Before the end of medical school, he returned to NIH as a HHMI-NIH Continued Support Fellow working with Carl Wu at the NCI. Following medical school, he completed his residency in clinical pathology at Brigham and Women's Hospital in Boston. Thereafter, he completed an HHMI Physician Postdoctoral Fellowship with Michael Rosbash at Brandeis University.

== Career ==
Allada is currently the executive director of the Michigan Neuroscience Institute. He also holds an professorship in the University of Michigan's Department of Anesthesiology and is the Theophile Raphael, M.D., Collegiate Professor of Neurosciences.

Prior to joining MNI in September 2023, Allada was a Professor and Chair of Neurobiology and a Professor and Associate Director of the Center for Sleep and Circadian Biology at Northwestern University. Allada also served on the NIH Sleep Disorders Research Advisory Board, the Society for Research on Biological Rhythms Board as a member and Secretary, and the Sleep Research Society's Board of Directors from 2020-2023.

The Allada lab focuses on finding molecular components of the circadian clock and their impacts on neurodegenerative diseases, sleep, jet lag, and memory processing. His lab has begun to shift its focus to research regarding sleep homeostasis. Allada's research has been supported financially by the NIH, the Defense Advanced Research Projects Agency, and other private foundations.

== Early research ==
=== Drosophila circadian rhythms ===
==== Molecular identification of the Drosophila Clock Gene (1998) ====
Using Drosophila melanogaster as a model organism, Allada and his team used forward genetics to discover a circadian rhythm gene called Drosophila Clock (dClock; Clk). Forward genetics screens for observable phenotypes that could potentially correspond to underlying genetic differences typically resulting from randomly induced mutagenesis. dClock (Clk) was discovered when Allada and his colleagues were completing a forward genetic screen of EMS mutagenized flies. The mutation found by Allada, that abolishes fly circadian rhythms is termed Jrk.

Functioning, CLOCK proteins encoded by the Clk gene form a dimer with CYCLE proteins. The formed dimer will bind to the E-box sequence which will activate the enhancers of per and tim genes. per and tim have been shown in Drosophila, to have daily rhythms of transcription. These per and tim mRNA transcripts are translated into proteins, PER and TIM, which heterodimerize and are essential for the circadian rhythms. The Jrk mutation within Clk, eliminates the cycling of per and tim mRNA transcripts which disrupts molecular and behavioral outputs of the circadian clock.

The studies of the Jrk mutation in the Clk gene showed dominant effects on the Drosophila. Half of the heterozygous flies demonstrate arrhythmic activity and reduce amplitude levels of per/tim transcripts in constant darkness. While all homozygous flies showed arrhythmic activity in constant darkness. Coupled with complementation data with a null deletion. Data suggests that the Jrk mutation has a negative dominant effect, meaning that only one copy of the gene is sufficient for phenotype interference. Further studies of the output of other clock proteins, namely, PERIOD (PER) and TIMELESS (TIM), showed very low expression levels.

In Drosophila, the two well studied clock genes, period (per) and timeless (tim) undergo circadian oscillations. The low levels of PER and TIM could be explained by lower protein stability or reduced protein synthesis due to mutant strains. To distinguish that from transcription levels, Allada et al conducted experiments measuring the levels of per and tim RNA. Experiment showed low levels and non-cycling levels of RNA which suggested reduced synthesis rather than stability. To compare its function to mouse CLOCK gene, in situ cloning and DNA sequencing was performed. A point mutation that changes a triplet codon to a premature stop codon. Allada et al concluded that the Jrk mutation disrupts the transcription cycling of per and tim, since it encodes a premature stop codon that abolished the function of the truncated C-terminal activation domain of the transcription factor bHLH-PAS.

==== Clk and cctopic circadian rhythms (2003-2005) ====
Further research on the dClock (Clk) gene and its role in the Drosophila transcription translation feedback loop (TTFL) revealed the gene's ability to stimulate gene expression of other components of the TTFL ectopically—or outside of pacemaker cells—and subsequently modify daily organismal behavior. Clk and other circadian genes are predominantly expressed in the "lateral" neurons (LN), the pacemaker neurons of the Drosophila central circadian clock.

Allada's research team worked to understand how the expression of certain clock genes influenced the expression of other clock genes and where these genes were expressed. They used the GAL4/UAS system to examine how the expression of certain clock genes, pigment dispersing factor gene (pdf) and long and short versions of the cry promoter DNA sequence, affected neuronal gene expression. Pdf-GAL4 and long cry-GAL4 were only active in known clock neurons, but the shorter cry sequence was also active in "non-circadian" neurons. When short cry-GAL4 was coupled with the UAS-Clk gene in these non-circadian neurons, these ectopic sites rhythmically expressed the genes Tim and even cry, a circadian clock component that is expressed antiphase to Tim. These results demonstrate that misexpression of Clk was sufficient to induce an ectopic circadian clock. Additionally, transgenic flies with misexpression of Clk displayed different patterns in locomotor activity to wild type files under light-dark conditions: they displayed a single peak of activity in the daytime, opposed to two peaks of activity in the morning and evening. These results suggest that the ectopic clocks were sufficient to influence behavioral circadian rhythms.

==== PDF receptor (2005) ====
To gain a deeper understanding of PDF's function, Allada and his colleagues worked to identify the PDF receptor protein. The receptor was found to be a class II peptide G protein-coupled receptor. The location of the PDF receptor was identified while observing fruit flies with an inversion mutation in a known potassium channel that disrupted circadian processes. It found that flies with this mutation in the potassium channel had a genomic insertion in the gene for the PDF receptor which caused the disruption. Flies possessing this receptor mutation became known as groom-of-PDF or gop. Comparing the oscillation of clock proteins within pacemaker neurons in wild-type flies to those in gop flies revealed an advance in clock protein oscillation. Allada and colleagues measured differences between the peaks of behavioral rhythmicity after genetically modifying PDF neurons to have a slower clock in both wild-type and gop flies. Wild-type flies with the genetically modified PDF neurons were able to delay peak behavioral rhythmicity whereas gop flies were not. PDF neurons being able to alter rhythmicity within wild-type flies demonstrates PDF's role as a signaling molecule. PDF's lack of ability to change rhythmicity within gop flies provides support that gop is a downstream receptor of PDF.

==== Casein kinase 2 (2002-2008) ====
casein kinase 2 (CK2) is a protein that helps to regulate key pacemaker proteins, TIM and PER. TIM and PER proteins form a heterodimer that serves to inhibit the further transcription of clock genes tim and per. Nuclear entry of the heterodimer inhibits CLK-CYC from activating any further transcription of tim and per. Therefore, regulation of TIM and PER genes is essential to regulating other clock genes and outputs. Allada sought to understand what molecular mechanisms underlie PER and TIM regulation. TIM and PER nuclear entry appears to be regulated by phosphorylation. Phosphorylation of this heterodimer is partially carried out by CK2, which is composed of different subunits CK2$\alpha$ and CK2$\beta$. Allada studied fruit flies with a mutant CK2$\alpha$ gene, termed CK2$\alpha$^{Tik} , and observed an abnormally long behavioral rhythm of about 33 hours. The lengthened period of the CK2$\alpha$^{Tik} mutants helped to highlight the importance of CK2 in regulating daily PER and TIM oscillations.

A later study conducted by Allada and his colleagues, attempted to understand why CK2 was important for regulation of the PER and TIM complex. To determine CK2's significance, Allada investigated flies with mutations in CK2 target sites in PER and TIM proteins. Mutations of PER CK2 target sites did not lead to abnormal accumulation of PER, but mutations in the TIM CK2 target sites did. The mutation in tim that caused the accumulation of PER, termed tim^{UL}, has a mutation at a serine site thought to prevent CK2 phosphorylation. Accumulation of PER proteins as a result of TIM CK2 target sites being mutated provides evidence that the purpose of CK2 is to regulate the stability of the TIM protein.

== Later research ==
=== How clocks control neuronal excitability (2005-2015) ===
Allada and colleagues are credited with understanding the na (NARROW ABDOMEN) gene's integral role in Drosophila circadian clock output and normal rest: activity. The Drosophila gene na codes for an ion channel with homology to the mammalian sodium leak channel, nonselective (NALCN). Mutants of na show poor circadian rhythms, yet oscillations of the clock protein PER remain; pacemaker neurons were found to express na and inducing na in pacemaker neurons is sufficient to restore normal locomotor activity rhythms. This served as an indication that NA likely functions on the clock output and "the mutant is a result of disruption in the coupling between the central clock and the neuronal networks controlling locomotion."

Further research on the NA ion channel provided evidence for DN1 pacemaker neurons as essential for light response and PDF signaling integration, mediating anticipatory locomotor behavior and robust daily rhythms in behavior. Mutants of na lack a significant increase in locomotor activity in response to light and show reduced free-running rhythms and anticipatory behavior before dawn, making na a potential gene involved in photic responses and clock function. Rescue of na in a cluster of posterior DN1 neurons implicates its role in "mediating the acute response to the onset of light" and anticipatory behavior, and pdf expression in DN1 partially rescues morning and free-running rhythms—including in DN1 neurons. These findings suggest that this section of the DN1 utilizes photic and PDF signaling to mediate the behavioral output of Drosophila.

Posterior DN1 pacemaker neurons demonstrate rhythmicity in firing rate throughout the day to facilitate behaviors of sleeping and waking, firing a lot in the morning and scarcely in the evening. DN1 membrane potentials and conductance of sodium and potassium have daily rhythms, indicating that they are potentially under circadian clock control. Allada's team discovered that a "voltage-independent sodium conductance via the NA/NALCN ion channel" raises the resting potential of DN1 cells to increase their firing rate during the day and is controlled by the rhythmic expression of its localization ER protein Nlf-1; potassium channels also peak in the evening to lower membrane potential, subdue DN1 firing and promote sleep . The researchers refer to this antiphase activity of sodium and potassium currents as a "bicycle" mechanism, and its discovery in nocturnal mice suggests this mechanism is ancient, well-conserved through evolution, and thus likely present in humans.

=== Sleep homeostasis (2006-2017) ===
==== Mushroom bodies (2006) ====
Drosophila has served as a model organism for studying the mechanisms and function of sleep since "flies and vertebrates share… behavioral and physiological traits of sleep," including the presence of both circadian and homeostatic sleep components. Allada's research team conducted one of the first unbiased neurogenetic screens for neurons identified the Drosophila mushroom bodies (MBs) as a major sleep regulatory center with an effect on wakefulness and sleep duration. The MBs are also well known for their role in learning and memory, connecting sleep regulation to memory consolidation.

==== RDL inhibition of PDF neurons (2009) ====
Transcriptional clock components and sleep homeostasis—or the basic principle of sleep regulation behind the biological response to sleep deprivation—mediate timely sleeping and waking. Research on the neuropeptide PDF and its receptor solidified the role of PDF as an output to the circadian clock, which is expressed in pacemaker neurons and promotes wakefulness, particularly late-night activity. They also further demonstrated the significance of the GABA_{A} receptor gene, Resistant to dieldrin (Rdl), in promoting sleep. RDL's role in PDF pacemaker neuron inhibition was supported by electrophysiological evidence that GABA induced an inward current of chloride and GABA antagonist picrotoxin blocked this current in lLNv neurons—PDF-secreting, arousal promoting pacemaker neurons. These findings outline one of first proposed wake-promoting circuits in Drosophila, which posits that PDF neuron activation in controlled by the circadian clock to time waking behavior and GABA serves an inhibitor of these neurons to promote sleep.

==== Rebound sleep (2012-2017) ====
Allada has continued to uncover the molecular basis of sleep homeostasis to further understand why sleep occurs. Focusing on when an organism is sleep deprived leads to what is known as compensatory sleep mechanisms. Sleep deprived organisms engaging in compensatory sleep or sleep rebound is a good indicator of homeostatic sleep regulation. Rebound sleep, is the longer than average sleep time following sleep deprivation of an organism. A genetic screen for Drosophila mutants with sleep disturbances yielded one of the most severe sleep phenotypes to date, mutants of Cul3 and insomniac (inc). Cul3 and inc refer to an E3 ubiquitin ligase and its adaptor, respectively, and disruption of these genes or the ability of these two constituents to interact results in reduced sleep duration and homeostatic response to sleep deprivation, implicating cul3 and inc in sleep homeostasis. It is known that cul3 and inc are implicated in protein ubiquitination, it is unclear how reduced activity of these genes impact sleep. Allada et al. propose that Inc/Cul3 proteins may "impact dopaminergic modulations of sleep", given that loss of cul3 and inc results in "hyper-arousability to a mechanical stimulus in adult flies" like flies with increased dopaminergic signaling. Additionally, the reduced sleep duration and homeostatic regulation phenotype of inc mutants can be rescued with pharmacological intervention that inhibits dopamine biosynthesis, composing the very limited records of successful pharmacological intervention of sleep homeostasis disruption. This evidence may be used to further our understanding of sleep as a molecular system.

=== Jet lag in athletes (2017) ===
Allada's interest in sports has continued throughout his life and, in 2017, he and his lab reported that jet lag impacted the performance of major league baseball players. Although circadian clocks have been studied extensively in controlled lab settings, the function of these biological clocks in natural settings has not been the case. With data from 40,000 MLB games spanning 20 years, they discovered a significant negative correlation between the time zone change experienced by players and their performance on the field. For example, east coast teams that had travelled west for games recorded decreased game performance after flying back home for home games. The difference is most significantly seen in pitchers who gave up more home runs. Interestingly, the study observed that jet lag effects were mostly evident after eastward travels with very limited effects after westward travel.

=== TimeSignature (2018) ===
The accurate assessment of physiological time using certain biomarkers found in human blood can improve diagnosis of circadian disorders and optimize chronotherapy. In order to receive an assessment of one's biological time, a dim light melatonin onset test is often used. This requires the patient to stay in low light condition, while numerous blood or saliva samples are taken from the patient. However, a new blood test that only requires two blood draws may be able to provide physicians with accurate patient chronotypes. Computational biologist Rosemary Braun, Allada et al, of Northwestern University published a new study in the Proceedings of the National Academy of Sciences USA. The study claimed that their blood draw test can be easily generalized to more patients. The major obstacle in developing a blood test is to find a reliable gene expression biomarker. Due to the diversity of measurement platforms and inherent variability, many biomarkers perform well in original data sets but cannot be universally applied to new samples. Machine learning algorithms can now learn which gene gives the best indication of biological time. With the help of TimeSignature, a computer algorithm that infers circadian time from gene expression, the team was able to yield highly accurate results with a wide population without renormalizing that data.

=== Neurodegenerative research ===
==== Huntington's Disease (2019) ====
Allada and his team have recently been studying a neurodegenerative disease called Huntington's disease and its relationship with circadian rhythm. Using a Drosophila model impaired with Huntington's disease, they found evidence that environmental and genetic perturbations of the circadian clock alter the neurodegeneration caused by Huntington's disease. The results suggested that the knockdown of the clock-regulated protein called Heat Shock Protein 70/90 Organizing Protein (HOP) reduces the mutant Huntington's disease aggregation and toxicity, providing evidence for the casual relationship between circadian clock and neurodegenerative disease.

==== Sleep waste (2021) ====
Allada has been studying proboscis extension sleep, a deep sleep stage in Drosophila similar to the human deep sleep. The study identified that the prevention of proboscis extensions increased injury related mortality and reduced waste clearance. Allada and his lab team administered luciferin, a substrate for firefly luciferase reporters and discovered evidence of a functional role in Drosophila proboscis extension sleep related to waste clearance. In subsequent experiments, Allada has emphasized the implication of the waste clearance functionality in maintaining brain health and preventing neurodegenerative disease.

== Positions and honors ==
- 2023 - Executive Director, Michigan Neuroscience Institute (MNI)
- 2016 - Edward C. Stuntz Distinguished Professorship in Neuroscience
- 2011 - Brain Research Foundation Seed Grant Award, Circadian Clock and Neurodegeneration
- 2008 - Distinguished Service Award, Society for Research on Biological Rhythms
- 2003-05 National Alliance for Research on Schizophrenia and Depression Young Investigator Award
- 1999-2003 Burroughs Welcome Career Award in the Biomedical Sciences
