= Paul M. Bingham =

American biologist

Paul Montgomery Bingham (born February 25, 1951) is an American molecular biologist and evolutionary biologist, Associate Professor in the Department of Biochemistry and Cell Biology at Stony Brook University and Vice President for Research at Rafael Pharmaceuticals. He is known for his work in molecular biology, and has also published recent articles and a book on human evolution.

== Biography ==
Bingham received his undergraduate degree at Blackburn College in Carlinville, Illinois, and then completed his PhD in Biochemistry and Molecular Biology at Harvard University in 1980 (thesis advisor, Matthew Meselson) after completing an MS in Microbiology at the University of Illinois (with John W. Drake). He spent two years at the National Institute of Environmental Health Sciences (NIEHS) before joining the faculty of the Department of Biochemistry and Cell Biology and the School of Medicine at Stony Brook University in 1982.

== Molecular biology ==
He was part of a collaborative team that discovered the parasitic DNA sequence element, the P element transposon. This enabled a widely used strategy still used today for retrieving genes from animals. It also shed fundamental new light on how evolution shapes the (self-interested) individual genes that collaborate to build organisms.

With his wife (Zuzana Zachar), he demonstrated that transposon insertion mutations were responsible for most of the alleles used in the development of classical genetics. He also collaborated with Carl Wu and Sarah Elgin (then at Harvard) on fundamental properties of metazoan chromatin structure. In collaboration with Margaret Kidwell, then at Brown University, and Gerry Rubin, then at the Carnegie Institution, he carried out the molecular cloning of the P element transposon in Drosophila. This work revolutionized the retrieval of genes in Drosophila and subsequently contributed to progress in metazoan molecular and developmental genetics. He and his collaborators were the first to propose the use of P element transposon tagging to clone the first metazoan RNA polymerase subunit. This work demonstrated that the P element is a recently invading parasite of the Drosophila genome and gene pool. Thus, P became the first clearly defined metazoan example of this long-suspected phenomenon.

His research group also worked on the nature of metazoan gene regulation and the elucidation of the first case of autoregulation of gene expression at the level of pre-mRNA splicing and of critical features of the nuclear organization of pre-mRNA processing and transport This latter work first clearly established the now-widely accepted model of channeled diffusion for the movement of most pre-mRNAs through the nuclear compartment.

Bingham and Zachar discovered the first-in-class anti-cancer mitochondrial metabolism drug (CPI-613; devimistat), currently in Phase III registrational clinical trials in pancreatic ductal adenocarcinoma and acute myeloid leukemia. This work is now being done in collaboration with Rafael Pharmaceuticals.

== Human evolutionary biology ==
In the mid-1990s, he developed a theory of human uniqueness that proposes a novel explanation of why humans have evolved to be ecologically dominant. The theory has been published in three peer-reviewed journals: The Quarterly Review of Biology, Evolutionary Anthropology and the Journal of Theoretical Biology.

He and co-author Joanne Souza have developed the theory further in a self-published book, Death from a Distance and the Birth of a Humane Universe. This work builds on W.D. Hamilton's theory of kin selection (Benefit x Relatedness > Cost) and posits that the genus Homo evolved when an ancestral organism developed the ability to effectively manage non-kin conflicts of interests by lowering the cost of coercion between non-kin individuals (Benefit > Cost of Coercion + Cost of Cooperation).

The theory, using precedents established in biological theory, proposes to explain many aspects of human social and sexual behavior. It proposed to account for the evolution of the human species from the advent of its phylogenetic branching from other hominins through physiological and behavioral adaptations until our current civilization. This theory of human uniqueness claims to answer the fundamental scientific challenge posed by Charles Darwin, to explain the descent of man: how did the 'incremental' process of evolution by natural selection suddenly produce an utterly unprecedented kind of animal, humans? It suggests an explanation of human origins, and also of human properties (from speech to political/economic/religious behavior).

According to his theory, the cost to an enforcer of coercing a cheating individual into a cooperative effort, known as the free-rider problem, was lowered when a precursor species to humans developed a way to threaten adult conspecifics from a distance by evolving the ability to throw projectiles with sufficient skill to reliably injure the cheater, especially conjointly with others. This reduced the personal risk to multiple enforcers as formulated by Lanchester's Square Law, when they gang up on a cheater. The theory proposes that this elite throwing ability initially allowed bands of proto-humans improved capacity to repel predators and scavenge their kills in the African savanna. It was later adapted as threat projection towards free-riding conspecifics (cheaters) in non-kin cooperative groups that made the cooperation evolutionarily stable against cheaters who, without coercion by this threat, would otherwise flourish and displace co-operators.

The theory further generalizes to a theory of history, claiming to account for many salient events of the two-million-year course of the human lineage—from the evolution of the genus Homo to the inception of behavioral modernity to the Neolithic Revolution to the rise of the nation-state.

== Academic work ==
In collaboration with Joanne Souza, he has developed a course on the logic and implications of this new theory .

Bingham has served as the Faculty Director of the Freshmen College of Human Development at Stony Brook .

Bingham also serves on the management team of Rafael Pharmaceuticals, a firm developing cancer therapies, as Vice President of Research. He and his collaborator, Prof. Zuzana Zachar, recently received the Maffetone Research Prize from the Carol M. Baldwin Breast Cancer Research Fund for their cancer work.

== Publications ==
=== Social coercion theory ===
- Bingham PM (1999). "Human uniqueness: A general theory". Quarterly Review of Biology. 74 (2): 133–169. doi:10.1086/393069. S2CID 59499229.
- Bingham PM (2000). "Human evolution and human history: A complete theory". Evolutionary Anthropology. 9 (6): 248–257. doi:10.1002/1520-6505(2000)9:6<248::AID-EVAN1003>3.0.CO;2-X.
- Souza J, Bingham PM (2019). "Chapter 7: The New Human Science: Sound, New Evolutionary Theory Gives Us Ultimate Causal Understanding of Human Origins, Behavior, History, Politics, and Economics". In Geher G, Wilson DS, Gallup A, Head H (eds.). Darwin's roadmap to the curriculum: evolutionary studies in higher education. New York, NY. pp. 117–156. doi:10.1093/oso/9780190624965.001.0001. ISBN 978-0-19-062496-5.
- Souza J, Bingham PM (2014). "Disciplinary unification of the Natural Sciences, the Humanities, and the Social Sciences: Adapted minds and strategic approaches to consilience in the Academy" (PDF). EvoS Journal: The Journal of the Evolutionary Studies Consortium. 6 (1): 51–62.
- Yumpu.com. "Theoretical Contribution - the EvoS Consortium!". yumpu.com.
- Bingham PM, Souza J (2013). "Theory testing in prehistoric North America: fruits of one of the world's great archeological natural laboratories". Evolutionary Anthropology. 22 (3): 145–53. doi:10.1002/evan.21359. PMID 23776052.
- Bingham PM, Souza J, Blitz JH (May 2013). "Introduction: social complexity and the bow in the prehistoric North American record". Evolutionary Anthropology. 22 (3): 81–8. doi:10.1002/evan.21353. PMID 23776043.
- Bingham P. "Ultimate causation in evolved human political psychology: implications for public policy" (PDF). APA PsycNet.
- Bingham PM (2010). "On the evolution of language: implications of a new and general theory of human origins, properties, and history". In Yamakido H, Larson RK, Déprez V (eds.). The Evolution of Human Language: Biolinguistic Perspectives. Approaches to the Evolution of Language. Cambridge: Cambridge University Press. pp. 211–224. doi:10.1017/cbo9780511817755.016. ISBN 978-0-521-51645-7.

=== Cancer research ===
- Alistar A, Morris BB, Desnoyer R, Klepin HD, Hosseinzadeh K, Clark C, et al. (June 2017). "Safety and tolerability of the first-in-class agent CPI-613 in combination with modified FOLFIRINOX in patients with metastatic pancreatic cancer: a single-centre, open-label, dose-escalation, phase 1 trial". The Lancet. Oncology. 18 (6): 770–778. doi:10.1016/s1470-2045(17)30314-5. PMC 5635818. PMID 28495639.
- Stuart SD, Schauble A, Gupta S, Kennedy AD, Keppler BR, Bingham PM, Zachar Z (March 2014). "A strategically designed small molecule attacks alpha-ketoglutarate dehydrogenase in tumor cells through a redox process". Cancer & Metabolism. 2 (1): 4. doi:10.1186/2049-3002-2-4. PMC 4108059. PMID 24612826.
- Zachar Z, Marecek J, Maturo C, Gupta S, Stuart SD, Howell K, et al. (November 2011). "Non-redox-active lipoate derivates disrupt cancer cell mitochondrial metabolism and are potent anticancer agents in vivo". Journal of Molecular Medicine. 89 (11): 1137–48. doi:10.1007/s00109-011-0785-8. PMID 21769686.
- Bingham PM, Stuart SD, Zachar Z (November 2014). "Lipoic acid and lipoic acid analogs in cancer metabolism and chemotherapy". Expert Review of Clinical Pharmacology. 7 (6): 837–46. doi:10.1586/17512433.2014.966816. PMID 25284345.
