= Jigsaw Man =

Jigsaw Man may refer to:

- "The Jigsaw Man", a 1967 short story by Larry Niven
- The Jigsaw Man, a 1976 novel by Dorothea Bennett
  - The Jigsaw Man (film), a 1983 espionage film based on the novel
- How the victim of the 2009 murder of Jeffrey Howe was initially referred to in the press
