= Nancy Craig =

Nancy L. Craig is a professor emerita of molecular biology and genetics at the Johns Hopkins University School of Medicine. She has done pioneering research on the molecular mechanisms of transposable elements, or mobile sequences of DNA found in the genomes of most known organisms.

== Education ==
Craig grew up in Concord, Calif., graduated from Concord High School and attended Bryn Mawr College, a women's college, as an undergraduate. She later described the environment as "empowering" due to lack of female role models elsewhere in science. After graduating in 1973 summa cum laude with an A.B. in biology and chemistry, Craig attended graduate school at Cornell University, where she studied the chemistry of DNA repair and the mechanisms of the cellular SOS response to DNA damage. She was particularly intrigued by the life cycle of the lambda phage, a virus that infects bacteria and is capable of integrating its genome into that of the host cell. Craig received her Ph.D. in 1980 and then joined the laboratory of Howard Nash at the National Institutes of Health as a postdoctoral fellow, where she continued to study lambda phage genome integration.

== Academic career ==
Craig joined the faculty in the departments of Microbiology & Immunology and Biochemistry & Biophysics at the University of California, San Francisco in 1984. She focused her research group's early work on developing in vitro systems for studying the transposon Tn7 and later cited the success of this effort as one of her career highlights. In 1992, Craig moved her laboratory from UCSF to Johns Hopkins University, where she remains a professor emerita. Craig was a Howard Hughes Medical Institute Investigator from 1991 to 2015. She was elected to the National Academy of Sciences in 2010.

== Research interests ==
Throughout her career, Craig has focused her research on transposable elements, or sequences of DNA that can change position in a genome. Transposons are found in the genomes of nearly all known organisms and gave rise to a large fraction of the human genome. In addition to the unusually specific transposon Tn7, her research has focused on families of transposons known as hAT transposons and piggyBac.

Since 2021, Craig has been senior vice president of Genetic Engineering and Mobile Elements and chair of the Scientific Advisory Board at SalioGen Therapeutics, a Lexington, Mass., corporation developing new methods of genetic medicine.
