= JRK =

JRK may stand for:

- Joseph Kony (born c. 1961), Ugandan terrorist and the founder of the Lord's Resistance Army
- JRK Property Holdings, an American real estate holding and property management company
- Jrk, a fruit fly gene
