= Howard Lipshitz =

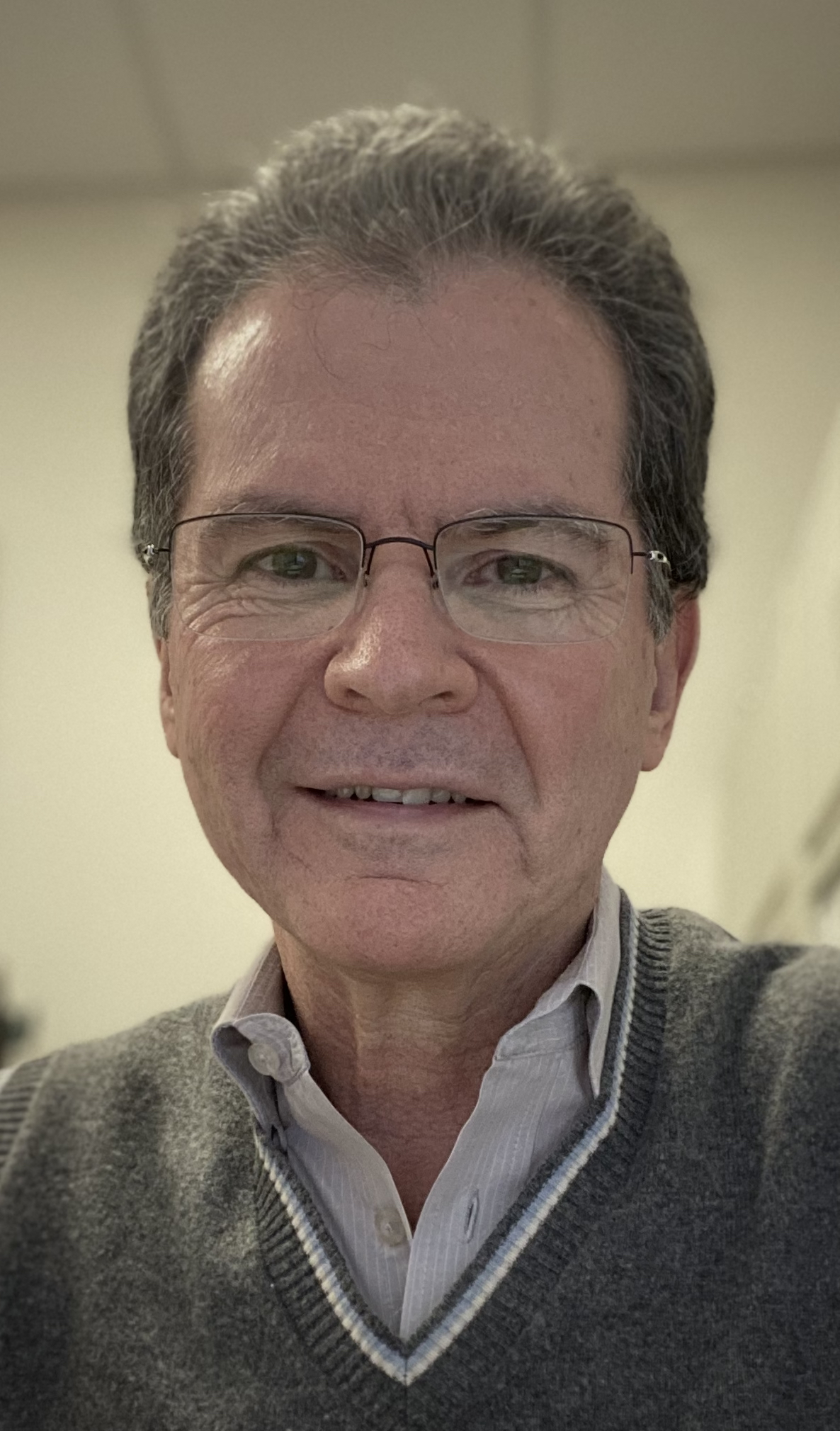
- Born: October 30, 1955 (age 70); South Africa
- Citizenship: United States, Canada
- Education: University of Natal; Yale University
- Scientific career
- Fields: Genetics, Developmental Biology, Genomics
- Institutions: California Institute of Technology; University of Toronto
- Doctoral advisor: Douglas Kankel
- Other academic advisors: David Hogness

Howard David Lipshitz (born October 30, 1955) is an American and Canadian biologist who does genetic research on the fruit fly, Drosophila.

== Early life and education ==
Lipshitz was born and raised in Durban, South Africa, where he attended the University of Natal (now the University of Kwazulu-Natal), obtaining a B.Sc. in Biological Sciences and Mathematical Statistics (1976) and a B.Sc.(Hons.) cum laude in Biological Sciences (1977). He completed his M. Phil. (1980) and Ph.D. (1983) degrees in Biology at Yale University with Douglas R. Kankel, working on Drosophila developmental neurogenetics. He then carried out postdoctoral research in the Biochemistry Department at Stanford University with David Hogness, where he defined the first long non-coding RNA, from the Bithorax complex of Drosophila.

== Career ==
In 1986 Lipshitz was appointed an Assistant Professor of Biology at the California Institute of Technology in Pasadena and promoted to Associate Professor in 1992. In 1995 he and his family moved to Toronto, where he held leadership positions at the Hospital for Sick Children's Research Institute (1996–2005) and at the University of Toronto, the latter as chair of its Department of Molecular Genetics (2005–2016). He served on the board of directors of the Society for Developmental Biology (2000–2006) and the Drosophila Board (2006–2009). He is one of the founders of the Rare Diseases Models and Mechanisms Network, Canada, serving on its Scientific Advisory Committee since 2011. He was Associate Editor (2011–2016), then Senior Editor (2016–2020) of G3: Genes, Genomes, Genetics and in January 2021 was appointed Editor-in-Chief of Genetics (journal). Both are peer-edited scientific journals published by the Genetics Society of America. He is a Fellow of the American Association for the Advancement of Science.

== Research ==
Lipshitz studies embryonic development and post-transcriptional regulation of gene expression in Drosophila with a focus on mRNA translation, stability and localization during the Maternal to zygotic transition and the role of RNA-binding proteins in this process. With collaborators he developed a panel of phage-displayed synthetic antibodies that recognize RNA-binding proteins and has used these to carry out-genome-wide studies of their mechanisms, functions and binding specificity (e.g.). He also collaborates with scientists who study mammalian development, using Drosophila as a model in which to elucidate the molecular functions of evolutionarily conserved genes (e.g.). Lipshitz has edited several books, most notably the collected works of his late colleague at Caltech, Nobel Laureate Edward B. Lewis, in which he provided detailed historical and scientific commentary on Lewis' contributions.

== Awards and honors ==
- Damant Science Prize, University of Natal (1975)
- South African National Scholarship (held at Yale University (1978-1980)
- Helen Hay Whitney Foundation Postdoctoral Fellowship (held at Stanford University) (1983-1986)
- Searle Scholar (held at California Institute of Technology) (1983-1986)
- Fellow, American Association for the Advancement of Science (1990)
- Canada Research Chair (Tier 1) in Developmental Biology (held at University of Toronto) (2002–2008)
- Honorary Professor, Department of Biochemistry, University of Hong Kong (2012–2019)
- Honorary Professor, School of Biomedical Sciences, University of Hong Kong (2017–2019)
- Qiushi Chair Professor, Zhejiang University School of Medicine, Hangzhou, China (2017–2020)
- Gordon and Betty Moore Distinguished Scholar, California Institute of Technology (2017)
