= Ann Chester Chandley =

Cytogeneticist, Fellow of the Royal Society of Edinburgh

Ann Chester Chandley FRSE
- Died: 19 February 2020
- Occupation: cytogeneticist
- Employer: Human Genetics Unit at the University of Edinburgh
- Known for: research on Y chromosome and fertility

Ann Chester Chandley DSc, F.I.Biol., FRSE (died 19 February 2020) was an international cytogeneticist with the Medical Research Council unit which became the Human Genetics Unit at the University of Edinburgh. She became a Fellow of the Institute of Biology in recognition of her contribution and a Fellow of the Royal Society of Edinburgh.

== Career ==
Chandley's work began at Christie Hospital with A.J. Bateman which established principles of sexual selection in gametes. Chandley also worked with Holt Radium Institute, and focussed on mutations and meiosis cell division, using cytogenetic methodology. These studies were on Drosophila and she completed her PhD in 1968. Chandley then moved on to study genetics in mammals and joined the Human Genetics Unit at Edinburgh. She was a visiting researcher at Cornell University with L. C. Dunn and Dorothea Bennett and Oak Ridge National Laboratory Dan Lindsley and Rhoda Grell.

Her research with Herb Stern and Yasuo Hotta which published in 1977, 'demonstrated conservation of the basic processes of meiotic recombination between plants and mammals.' Her work with Tim Hargreave on the impact of chromosomal variants on fertility, and studying the Y-chromosome using new techniques. Researching with Kun Ma, Chandley found an RNA binding protein, gene RBMY on the Y-chromosome which 'may be involved in regulating germline splicing activity'. Due to the interest in causes of male infertility, she studied 1600 infertile males, and undertook technical projects on a subset. Chandley wrote about the research techniques and impact for human conditions such as Down syndrome. Her work with Roger Short and Twink Allen included the first description of the mechanism which caused infertility in horses and mules and hybrids, which helped her become an advisor to hybrid-breeders and visiting in China and Mongolia. She was on the editorial board of the science journal Chromosome Research. Chandley produced or collaborated in 130 research publications in her career.

When she was due to retire in 1997, a tribute and appreciation Festschrift celebration was held, and contributions were sought from fellow scientists in Manchester, Salisbury, Abingdon, Cambridge, Kew, Wirral and Leicester as well as Germany and Sweden. The event took place at the Royal Society of Edinburgh on 5 September 1996.

== Personal life and education ==
Ann Chester Chandley was born in Gatley, Cheshire and attended Cheadle Hulme School. She graduated in 1957 in Botany Zoology and Chemistry from the University of Manchester.

Chandley was also a patron of the Festival Theatre and wrote to the press to comment on current Scottish political affairs including supporting free transport and speaking out for currency policy in the 2014 Scottish Independence Referendum.
