= Steven A. Farber =

American scientist

Steven Arthur Farber is an American scientist. He is a Professor of Biology at Johns Hopkins University.

== Education ==
Steven Arthur Farber completed a bachelor of science in engineering with a major in electrical and biomedical engineering from Rutgers University in 1986. He earned a master of science in technology and policy in 1991 and a doctor of philosophy in neurology in 1993 at Massachusetts Institute of Technology. His dissertation was titled Neuronal activity and membrane turnover in rat brain. His thesis supervisor was Richard Wurtman. Farber was a Carnegie Fellow in Marnie Halpern's laboratory.

== Career ==
Farber was an assistant professor at Thomas Jefferson University. In 2004, he became a staff researcher at the Carnegie Institution for Science in the department of embryology. In 2021 he moved to the Biology Department at Johns Hopkins University. In 2018, he was awarded a 5-year $3.3 million NIH grant for researching novel pharmaceuticals and diseases associated with altered levels of lipoproteins.

In 2002, together with Jamie Shuda he developed an outreach program named BioEYES which allowed students to gain hands-on biology experience by studying live zebrafish in the classroom.

== Honors and awards ==
- 2018 Elizabeth W. Jones Award for Excellence in Education from the Genetics Society of America
- 2020 Bruce Alberts Award for Excellence in Science Education from the American Society for Cell Biology
