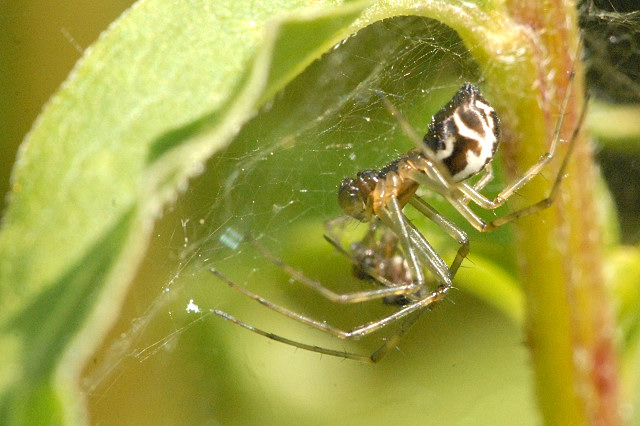

Scientific classification
- Kingdom: Animalia
- Phylum: Arthropoda
- Subphylum: Chelicerata
- Class: Arachnida
- Order: Araneae
- Infraorder: Araneomorphae
- Family: Linyphiidae
- Genus: Frontinellina
- Species: F. frutetorum

Binomial name
- Frontinellina frutetorum C. L. Koch, 1835

= Frontinellina frutetorum =

Species of spider

Frontinellina frutetorum is a species of sheet weaver found in Europe, West and Central Asia and North Africa.

== Description ==
This species has a reddish-brown front section (prosoma) and a black, oval rear section (opisthosoma) marked with white or yellow stripes. Its legs are reddish-yellow with dark bands at the joints. The female's abdomen is notably swollen and square-shaped from the side. Males are 5–6 mm long, and females are slightly larger at 5.5–6 mm.

== Distribution ==
The species exhibits a vast Palearctic distribution.It is present in Albania, Algeria, Andorra, Austria, Azerbaijan, Belgium, Bosnia and Herzegovina, Bulgaria, Croatia, Cyprus, the Czech Republic, Georgia, Germany, Greece (including Crete), France (including Corsica), Hungary, Israel, Italy (including Sardinia and Sicily), Kosovo, Liechtenstein, Moldova, Montenegro, Morocco, North Macedonia, Poland, Portugal, Romania, Russia (Central, Eastern, and Southern Russia), Serbia, Slovakia, Slovenia, Spain (including the Balearic Islands), Switzerland, Tunisia, entire Turkey, Ukraine and the United Kingdom.
