= Jeffrey H. Miller =

American physician and professor

- Born: April 8, 1944 (age 82); White Plains, New York
- Education: University of Rochester; Harvard University; University of Geneva
- Scientific career
- Fields: Microbiology; Immunology; Molecular genetics; Mutagenesis
- Workplaces: University of California Los Angeles
- Doctoral advisor: Jon Beckwith

Jeffrey H. Miller (born April 8, 1944) is an American microbiologist. His primary field of work revolves around the biological science of mutagenesis. While attending Harvard University he undertook research exploring IS1 insertions of the lacl gene. His current body of work at the University of California, Los Angeles primarily revolves around various aspects of mutagenesis and the exploration between DNA repair and the avoidance of mutagenesis in bacterial cells. His research also examines how mutagens may be used to enhance antibiotic effectiveness.

== Early life and education ==
Jeffery H. Miller was born on April 8, 1944, in White Plains, New York. Miller grew up curious about science and compelled by education during the Cold War. He began college at the University of Rochester in 1962 with no clear ideas about which area of science he should focus on. Miller credits Ernst Caspari and Richard Lewontin, professors of biological sciences, for his interest in molecular biology. During his time at the University of Rochester, Miller had his research published for the first time under Dr. Hank Sobell with a project on crystallography. He finished his time at Rochester receiving his undergraduate degree in biology.

Miller went on to Harvard University for graduate school in 1966 with his main focus of molecular biology. During his time at Harvard, he worked under James Watson, Konrad Bloch, and Walter Gilbert (all Nobel Prize winners). This work with the lacl messaging mutations, led to his further work in mutagenesis. He also studied his thesis project under the direction of Johnathan Beckwith.

His next steps of education led him to Germany for his postdoctorate at the Institute for Genetics at the University of Cologne. He studied this work under the direction of Benno Müller-Hill.

== Mutagenesis beginnings ==
Miller transitioned to mutagenesis while working in Geneva during the summer of 1972 working with Don Ganem. While attempting to find UAG mutations on the lacl gene in E. coli, he was able to find 500 mutants that carried the gene. This opened Miller's world to mutagenesis when he realized that the field was largely unexplored. This led to his first significant study in mutagenesis in collaboration with Harvard University where he defined sequences around the IS1 insertions of the lacl gene. This led to him bringing his work back to the United States, this time at the University of California, Los Angeles.

== Current work ==
Miller and his colleagues are currently working to better understand the action, resistance, and sensitivity of antibiotics. Miller states that him lecturing on MRSA (methicillin-resistant Staphylococcus aureus) in several courses and his close encounter with the "superbug" has started them down this path. His personal experience with MRSA began in January 2011, when an ear infection turned harrowing. When the initial set of antibiotics did not respond he spent four days in the hospital being intravenously treated with vancomycin which eventually stopped the bacteria. Miller stated that this experience strengthened his conviction, and he has been working these past years to link antibiotics to DNA repair. Miller and his colleagues have been using the KEIO collection to study an array of antibiotics.

== Publications ==
- Zeibell, K., Aguila, S., Yan Shi, V., Chan, A., Yang, H., & Miller, J. H. (2007). Mutagenesis and repair in Bacillus anthracis: the effect of mutators. Journal of bacteriology, 189(6), 2331–2338. https://doi.org/10.1128/JB.01656-06
- Yang, H., Wolff, E., Kim, M., Diep, A., & Miller, J. H. (2004). Identification of mutator genes and mutational pathways in Escherichia coli using a multicopy cloning approach. Molecular microbiology, 53(1), 283–295. https://doi.org/10.1111/j.1365-2958.2004.04125.x
- Ang, J., Song, L. Y., D'Souza, S., Hong, I. L., Luhar, R., Yung, M., & Miller, J. H. (2016). Mutagen Synergy: Hypermutability Generated by Specific Pairs of Base Analogs. Journal of bacteriology, 198(20), 2776–2783. https://doi.org/10.1128/JB.00391-16
- Song, L. Y., Goff, M., Davidian, C., Mao, Z., London, M., Lam, K., Yung, M., & Miller, J. H. (2016). Mutational Consequences of Ciprofloxacin in Escherichia coli. Antimicrobial agents and chemotherapy, 60(10), 6165–6172. https://doi.org/10.1128/AAC.01415-16
- Song, L. Y., D'Souza, S., Lam, K., Kang, T. M., Yeh, P., & Miller, J. H. (2016). Erratum for Song et al., Exploring Synergy between Classic Mutagens and Antibiotics To Examine Mechanisms of Synergy and Antibiotic Action. Antimicrobial agents and chemotherapy, 60(4), 2600. https://doi.org/10.1128/AAC.00429-16
