= Utpal Banerjee =

American biologist

- Born: 1957 (age 68–69); New Delhi, India
- Education: St. Stephen's College, Delhi; Delhi University; IIT Kanpur; California Institute of Technology
- Scientific career
- Fields: Molecular biologist
- Workplaces: University of California, Los Angeles

Utpal Banerjee (born 1957) is a distinguished professor of the department of molecular, cell and developmental biology at UCLA. He obtained his Bachelor of Science degree in chemistry from St. Stephen's College, Delhi University, India and obtained his Master of Science degree in physical chemistry from the Indian Institute of Technology, Kanpur, India. In 1984, he obtained a PhD in chemistry from the California Institute of Technology where he was also a postdoctoral Fellow in the laboratory of Seymour Benzer from 1984 to 1988.

Banerjee joined UCLA in 1988 as an assistant professor and attained the rank of full professor in 1994 in the department of molecular, cell and developmental biology. He became vice-chair of that department in 1998, chair in 2001 until 2017, and the Irving and Jean Stone Endowed Chair in Life Science in 2009. He has a joint appointment in the department of biological chemistry at the David Geffen School of Medicine and is also co-director of the UCLA Broad Stem Cell Research Center. Banerjee teaches courses in genetics that encourage undergraduates to participate in research and he is the director of the UCLA Interdepartmental Minor in Biomedical Research. He has also taught many genetics and developmental biology classes to undergraduate and graduate students. He is among 20 professors nationally to be awarded a $1 million grant by the Howard Hughes Medical Institute to creatively improve undergraduate science teaching.

== Honors and awards ==
Banerjee was elected Member of the National Academy of Sciences (2018); director, Genetics Society of America board of directors (2010); Fellow of the American Association for the Advancement of Science (2009); Fellow of the American Academy of Arts and Sciences (2008); president of the Drosophila Board, Genetics Society of America (2008). He also served on the Life Sciences jury for the Infosys Prize in 2014.

He was awarded the NIH Director's Pioneer Award, National Institutes of Health (2011); Professors Award, Howard Hughes Medical Institute (2010, 2006, 2002); Elizabeth W. Jones Award for Excellence in Education, Genetics Society of America (2010); Professor Mager Memorial Lecturer, University of Jerusalem, Israel (2004); Deans’ Recognition Award, UCLA (2003); Gold Shield Faculty Prize, UCLA (2000); One of the Top 20 Professors of the Bruin Century, UCLA Today (2000); Kalfayan Memorial Lecture, University of North Carolina (1999); Margaret E. Early Medical Research Trust Award (1998); Harriet and Charles Luckman Distinguished Teaching Award, UCLA (1997); Eby Award for the Art of Teaching, UCLA (1997); Investigator Award, McKnight Endowment Fund for Neuroscience (1996); Faculty Research Award, American Cancer Society (1993); Distinguished Faculty Teaching Award, Department of Biology, UCLA (1992); Alfred P. Sloan Foundation Award (1990–1992); McKnight Foundation Scholars Award (1989); Life Sciences Research Foundation Award Burroughs Wellcome Fund Fellow (1986–1988); Del E. Webb Postdoctoral Fellowship (1983–1986); Certificate of Merit, Indian Institute of Technology, Kanpur (1977 1978); Sheshadri Memorial Award of the Delhi University (1977); National Paper Reading Prize (1976); National Science Talent Award (1974).

Banerjee is the third highest-salaried professor at a public university in the state of California.

== Research ==
Earlier work from Banerjee's laboratory identified the Son of sevenless (Sos) gene that links RTKs to the oncogene Ras. His laboratory has also identified novel means by which different signal transduction cascades combine to distinguish between neural and non-neural cell types. They have also made critical discoveries in identifying transcription factors and signaling components that are responsible for hematopoiesis in Drosophila.

=== Blood Stem Cell Maintenance ===
Banerjee's research focuses on the maintenance of blood stem cells, specifically hematopoietic stem cells that are maintained within a microenvironment where signals from a niche are important for the maintenance of quiescence within a precursor population. Lack of such a niche-derived signal will cause loss of "stemness," resulting in increased proliferation and eventual differentiation. His research examines this phenomenon in the Drosophila hematopoietic organ using genetic technologies available in this model organism.

Results from Banerjee's lab have shown that the "stemness" of these cells is maintained through the combined action of a Niche Signal, that is generated by Hedgehog (Hh), a local signal generated by Wingless/Wnt and a reverse signal from the differentiated cells to the stem cells. His team has termed this combined action the Equilibrium Signal. Several important concepts underlying Drosophila blood development have allowed them to propose this system as an appropriate genetic model for vertebrate hematopoiesis, and these molecular mechanisms are being explored in the laboratory.

=== Stress Response systems ===
Banerjee's studies have led to the investigation of multiple stress response systems. Myeloid blood cells are ideal for the study of response to many kinds of stresses. Hypoxia-related factors and free radicals known as reactive oxygen species (ROS) play a role both in hematopoietic development and in stress response. Similarly, his lab has found that the NF-κB derived inflammatory response plays a major role in the way blood cells respond to injury at distant sites. Banerjee's emerging view from these studies is that basic developmental mechanisms are co-opted again for stress, injury and inflammatory responses by the myeloid hematopoietic system. Genetic analysis will allow his team to understand the interrelationship between these important biological phenomena that have great relevance to diseases and disorders in humans.

=== Metabolic control in Cancer pathways ===
Banerjee and his researchers are also interested in the study of metabolic control in cancer pathways. In the past, his lab has identified components of signal transduction pathways that participate in oncogenesis. In addition, they have examined the role of the mitochondrion in controlling cell cycle, particularly that when cells become transformed they choose alternate means of metabolism (a phenomenon referred to as the Warburg effect). Also of interest to Banerjee and his team is studying the effect of signal transduction pathways on the control of cellular metabolism and the proper balance between cellular growth and metabolism that goes awry in cancer.
