= Bruce Alberts Award for Excellence in Science Education =

American Society for Cell Biology award

The Bruce Alberts Award for Excellence in Science Education is awarded annually by the American Society for Cell Biology. It is awarded to an individual who has demonstrated innovative and sustained contributions to science education, with particular emphasis on the broad local, regional, and/or national impact.

== Awardees ==
- 2020 Steven Farber
- 2020 Jamie Shuda
- 2019 Mary Pat Wenderoth
- 2018 Erin Dolan
- 2017 Kimberly Tanner
- 2016 David Lopatto
- 2015 Deborah Harmon Hines
- 2014 Edison Fowlks
- 2013 Deborah Allen
- 2012 L.C. (Cam) Cameron
- 2011 Peter Bruns
- 2010 BioQUEST Curriculum Consortium
- 2009 Manuel Berriozábal and Toby Horn
- 2008 Wm. David Burns and Karen K. Oates
- 2007 Patricia J. Pukkila
- 2006 A. Malcolm Campbell and Sarah C.R. Elgin
- 2005 Samuel Silverstein
- 2004 William Wood
- 2003 Nancy Hutchison
- 2002 Sandra Mayrand
- 2001 David Bynum
- 2000 Virginia Shepherd
- 1999 Eugenie Scott
- 1998 Robert DeHaan
