= Brenda Andrews =

Canadian biologist

- Education: University of Toronto Faculty of Medicine (BS, PhD); University of California, San Francisco
- Occupations: Canadian academic, researcher and biologist

Brenda Jean Andrews CC FRSC is a Canadian academic, researcher and biologist at the University of Toronto Faculty of Medicine specializing in systems biology and molecular genetics.

Andrews is known for her studies on cell cycle-regulated transcription and protein kinase function in yeast and for pioneering work.

In 2015, Andrews co-led a team of biology scientists at the University of Toronto's Donnelly Centre to create the first ever fully detailed protein map of a cell, the map showed the location of all protein in a cell, the project aimed to benefit and help increase research for cancer cells. The research consisted of data gatherings from 20 million cells. Andrews' research aims at showing the complexity of a single gene and how it interacts with multiple genes.

Andrews is currently university professor in the Donnelly Centre for Cellular and Biomolecular Research and the Department of Molecular Genetics at the University of Toronto Faculty of Medicine where she also directs Andrews Lab. She is noted for her research and publications relating to genetics and genetic disorders. In 2017, Andrews was named as a university professor, the highest faculty honor at the University of Toronto. In 2020, she was honoured to be an international member of the National Academy of Sciences.

== Education ==
Andrews graduated from the University of Toronto where she received a Bachelor of Science in zoology in 1980 and later with a PhD in medical biophysics in 1986. She later went to the University of California, San Francisco for her post-doctorate training directed by geneticist Ira Herskowitz in 1991. She later returned to the University of Toronto for teaching and researching positions, where she became an assistant professor and later became chair for the Department of Medical Genetics.

After serving as Chair of Medical Genetics for five years, Andrews took a position Chair of the Banting & Best Department of Medical Research and as the inaugural Director of the Donnelly Centre. She continued as director of the Donnelly Centre and Charles H Best Chair of Medical Research until 2020 and was named a university professor in 2017. Andrews is a Companion of the Order of Canada, an elected Fellow of the Royal Society of Canada, the American Association for the Advancement of Science and the American Academy of Microbiology, and an International Member of the National Academy of Sciences (USA).

She has been a speaker and keynoted at many international conferences and events. Andrews has been a figure in voicing concerns of lack of scientific research funding from the federal government and promotes increased funding for lab research in Canada.

She is the current and founding editor-in-chief of open access scientific journal G3: Genes, Genomes, Genetics by the Genetics Society of America.

== Awards ==
In December 2015, Andrews was awarded the Order of Canada as a companion, the highest grade of the order, for her contributions in systems biology research and contributions to research in molecular genetics. Andrews was elected as a fellow for the Royal Society of Canada in 2005 and holds numerous awards and memberships relating to the sciences including elected fellow of the American Society for Microbiology, fellow of the American Association for the Advancement of Science and senior fellow at the Canadian Institute for Advanced Research where she became the director for the institute's genetics research area. Other awards includes:

- Premier's Research Excellence Award
- Fellowship & scientist at the Medical Research Council of Canada (now known as the Canadian Institutes of Health Research)
- Ira Herskowitz Award, 2010
- Henry G. Friesen International Prize in Health Research, 2025
