= Elizabeth W. Jones =

American geneticist and professor

- Born: March 8, 1939; Seattle, Washington
- Died: June 11, 2008 (aged 69)
- Education: University of Washington
- Known for: Work on yeast genetics
- Awards: Genetics Society of America's Excellence in Education Award (2007)
- Scientific career
- Fields: Genetics
- Institutions: Carnegie Mellon University
- Thesis: A comparative study of two adenine loci in Saccharomyces cerevisiae (1964)
- Academic advisors: Herschel L. Roman

Elizabeth Winifred Jones (March 8, 1939 – June 11, 2008) was an American geneticist and professor at Carnegie Mellon University (CMU).

== Education ==
Jones earned her bachelor's degree in chemistry in 1960 and her Ph.D. in genetics in 1964, both from the University of Washington. She worked with Herschel L. Roman for her Ph.D., which was the first ever granted by the University of Washington in genetics. She went on to complete her postdoc at the Massachusetts Institute of Technology.

== Career ==
Jones joined the faculty of CMU in 1974, after spending five years on the faculty at Case Western Reserve University. She served as president of the Genetics Society of America (GSA) in 1987 and as editor-in-chief of its journal, Genetics, from 1996 to 2008. In 2002, she was named a Howard Hughes Medical Institute Professor. When she died in 2008, she was a University Professor, head of the Department of Biological Sciences, and Frederick A. Schwertz Distinguished Professor of Life Sciences at CMU.

== Honors and awards ==
Jones was awarded a Guggenheim Fellowship in 1981 and the first GSA Excellence in Education Award in 2007. She was an elected fellow of the American Association for the Advancement of Science, and the American Academy of Microbiology She also received the Robert Doherty Prize for Excellence in Education and the Julius Ashkin Teaching Award from CMU's Mellon College of Science.

=== Posthumous recognition ===
After her death in 2008, Jones was awarded the GSA's Lifetime Achievement Award in Yeast Genetics and Molecular Biology. The GSA also renamed its Excellence in Education Award the Elizabeth W. Jones Award for Excellence in Education in her memory. CMU also created the Elizabeth W. Jones Award for Excellence in Undergraduate Research in Experimental or Computational Biology, in honor of Jones' support for undergraduate research.
