= Elizabeth W. Jones Award for Excellence in Education =

The Elizabeth W. Jones Award for Excellence in Education is awarded annually by the Genetics Society of America to recognize individuals who have made noteworthy contributions to genetics education. It was founded in 2007 as the Genetics Society of America Award for Excellence in Education. Its first recipient was Elizabeth W. Jones, after whom the award was renamed following her death in 2008.

== Recipients ==
Source: Genetics Society of America

- 2007: Elizabeth W. Jones
- 2008: R. Scott Hawley
- 2009: Sarah Elgin
- 2010: Utpal Banerjee
- 2011: Peter J. Bruns
- 2012: David A. Micklos
- 2013: A. Malcolm Campbell
- 2014: Robin Wright
- 2015: Louisa A. Stark
- 2016: William Wood
- 2017: Sally G. Hoskins
- 2018: Steven A. Farber, Carnegie Institute for Science & Jamie Shuda
- 2019: Bruce Weir
- 2020: Seth Bordenstein, Vanderbilt University
- 2021: Edward J. Smith, Virginia Tech
- 2022: Alana O'Reilly and Dara Ruiz-Whalen, Fox Chase Cancer Center and eCLOSE Institute

== See also ==
- List of genetics awards
