= DeLill Nasser =

American geneticist (1929–2000)

- Died: 2000 (aged 70–71)
- Occupation: Geneticist
- Years active: 1967–2000
- Known for: Program Director for NSF's Genetics Department

DeLill S. Nasser (1929–2000) was an American geneticist who was referred to by R. Scott Hawley as the "patron saint of real genetics". A Hoosier, she obtained undergraduate and graduate degrees in bacteriology before becoming a professor at the University of Florida. She accepted a position at the National Science Foundation years later and eventually became program director for the eukaryotic division of the genetics program, from which she promoted genetics as its own science. Her promotion of genetics research was highly influential in the creation of the Arabidopsis thaliana genome project and its use as a model organism. Given multiple awards for her director work, she had an official scholarship named after her by the Genetics Society of America.

== Childhood and education ==
Born in 1929 to Sam J. Nasser and Elvira Nasser, Nasser attended State High School and went on to obtain a Bachelor's of Science from Indiana State University. She received a Master's degree for bacteriology in 1955 from Purdue University and became a graduate research assistant in 1956. She was also a class instructor at the time and worked at Eli Lilly and Company. Nasser enrolled at Purdue University to begin studying for a Ph.D. in 1960 and graduated with a doctorate in 1964. She then took a postdoctoral position at the University of Washington in the lab of Eugene Nester.

== Career ==
Nasser applied for and received a professorship in 1967 at the University of Florida's Department of Bacteriology. By 1977, she was living in San Francisco and had recently gotten a divorce, so applied for new jobs elsewhere in the country. Receiving offers from both the National Science Foundation (NSF) and the National Institutes of Health (NIH), she chose the former in order to replace the position that Mary Wolff had recently left for the NIH. Therefore, beginning in 1978, she was made associate program director for the Division of Molecular and Cellular Biosciences in the NSF. In 1980, she was a staunch supporter and funder through her NSF position of the researchers who would begin the genetics work on Arabidopsis thaliana that would lead to it becoming a model organism in the field.

The previous program director for her department, Philip Harriman, took a one-year leave in 1981 to be involved in a congressional scientific fellowship program. When he returned, instead of taking back up his prior position that Nasser had been filling in the meantime, he was asked to fill a deputy assistant director role in the Biological, Behavioral, and Social Sciences department. Normally, Nasser would have then officially stepped into his program director role, but the genetics department's growth led to it being split into two separate eukaryotic and prokaryotic departments, though still formally under the joint label of the Genetic Biology Program. Nasser became program director of the former group that included plants and animals and Harriman took the director position of the latter involving bacteria, viruses, and fungi.

== Organizations ==
Nasser was a member of the Genetics Society of America and the Society of American Bacteriologists.

== Awards ==
The Director's Award was given to Nasser at the December 7, 2000 meeting of the National Science Foundation at the Cold Spring Harbor Laboratory meeting, but she was unable to attend and receive the award in person due to the ongoing effects of cancer. In 2001, after Nasser's death, the Genetics Society of America established the DeLill Nasser Award for Professional Development in Genetics to be given to graduate-level geneticists in order to fund their research presentations in academic conferences.

== Personal life ==
During her college years, Nasser was a member of the Sigma Xi scientific honor society. She died in 2000 from lung cancer.
