= Ernst Caspari =

German-American geneticist (1909–1988)

- Born: Ernst Wolfgang Caspari; October 24, 1909; Berlin, German Empire
- Died: August 11, 1988 (aged 78); Rochester, New York
- Citizenship: American
- Education: University of Göttingen
- Known for: Behavioral genetics Developmental genetics
- Awards: Behavior Genetics Association's Dobzhansky Award (1979)
- Scientific career
- Fields: Genetics
- Institutions: Lafayette College; Wesleyan University; University of Rochester
- Doctoral advisor: Alfred Kühn

Ernst Wolfgang Caspari (October 24, 1909 – August 11, 1988) was a German-American geneticist known for his research on behavioral and developmental genetics.

== Early life and education ==
Caspari was born on October 24, 1909, in Berlin, Germany. He was one of four children of Wilhelm Caspari, a physiologist, and his wife Gertrud. Despite being from a Jewish family, Wilhelm and Gertrud were Protestants, as were their children: Ernst, Fred, Irene, and Max. Ernst attended the Kaiser-Friedrich-Schule in Berlin, followed by the Goethe-Gymnasium zu Frankfurt. He decided he wanted to become a geneticist after reading a copy of Richard Goldschmidt's book Ascaris, eine Einführung in die Wissenschaft vom Leben für Jedermann as a Christmas present when he was 14. He emigrated to the United States in 1938, and became a naturalized citizen of the United States in 1944. He was trained by Alfred Kühn at the University of Göttingen, receiving his Ph.D. there in 1933. He was forced by the Nazis to leave his position in Kühn's lab later that year.

== Academic career ==
Caspari became a fellow of biology at Lafayette College in 1938, where he became an assistant professor of biology in 1941. At Lafayette, he met L. C. Dunn, with whom he subsequently collaborated on several topics in mouse genetics research. He served as a professor of biology at Wesleyan University from 1949 to 1960, when he became professor and chairman of the Department of Biology at the University of Rochester. He remained on the faculty of the University of Rochester until his retirement in 1975. He was president of the Genetics Society of America in 1966 and the editor-in-chief of its journal, Genetics, from 1968 to 1972.

== Honors and awards ==
Caspari was named a fellow of the American Association for the Advancement of Science in 1942, and became a member of the American Academy of Arts and Sciences in 1959. He was a fellow of the Center for Advanced Study in the Behavioral Sciences in 1956-57 and in 1965-66. In 1979, he received the Dobzhansky Award from the Behavior Genetics Association.
