= Terry Magnuson =

American geneticist

- Magnuson in 2016
- Born: Terry R. Magnuson; Upper Peninsula, Michigan, U.S.
- Education: University of Redlands; Weill Cornell Medicine
- Scientific career
- Fields: Developmental genetics
- Workplaces: Case Western Reserve University; University of North Carolina at Chapel Hill

Terry R. Magnuson is an American developmental geneticist and academic administrator who is the Kay M. & Van L. Weatherspoon Eminent Distinguished Professor of Genetics. He was the founding chair of the department of genetics at University of North Carolina at Chapel Hill (UNC) from 2000 to 2016. From July 1, 2016, to 2022, he served as the vice chancellor for research.

== Life ==
Magnuson was born on the Upper Peninsula of Michigan. He earned a bachelor's degree in biology from University of Redlands. He completed a Ph.D. at the Weill Cornell Medicine. He was a postdoctoral researcher in the laboratory of Charles Epstein where he also collaborated with Gail R. Martin. From 1978 to 1979, Magnuson was a postdoctoral fellow at the National Science Foundation.

Magnuson was a faculty member at Case Western Reserve University. In 2000, he joined UNC School of Medicine as its founding chair of the department of genetics, a position he held until 2016. In 2010, he became its vice dean for research. From July 1, 2016, to 2022, he served as the vice chancellor for research at University of North Carolina at Chapel Hill.

In 1999, Magnuson was the co-editor-in-chief of Genesis. In 2007, he was elected to the American Academy of Arts and Sciences. He is a member of the National Academy of Medicine. In 2019, he became president of the Genetics Society of America.
