= Central Russia =

Various areas in European Russia

Central Economic Region Central Federal District European Russia

Central Russia is, broadly, the various areas in European Russia.

Historically, the area of Central Russia varied based on the purpose for which it is being used. It may, for example, refer to European Russia (except the North Caucasus and Kaliningrad).

The 1967 book by Stephen P. Dunn and Ethel Dunn The Peasants of Central Russia defines the area as the territory from Novgorod Oblast to the north to the border with Ukraine in the south and from Smolensk Oblast to the west and Volga to the east. A review of the book clarifies that this concept is treated in the book as the historical and ethnographical one: this is the historical area of Great Russians.

== See also ==
- Central Agricultural Zone (Russia)
- Central Military District – placed in Ural and Siberia, not in Central Russia
- Central Russian Upland
- Political divisions of Russia
