= CBE: Life Sciences Education =

- Discipline: Biology
- Language: English
- Edited by: Miriam Segura

Publication details
- Former name: Cell Biology Education
- History: 2002–present
- Publisher: American Society for Cell Biology
- Frequency: Quarterly
- Open access: Yes
- Impact factor: 3.6 (2025)

Standard abbreviations
- ISO 4: CBE: Life Sci. Educ.
- NLM: CBE Life Sci Educ

Indexing
- ISSN: 1931-7913

Links
- Journal homepage

CBE: Life Sciences Education is an online, quarterly journal owned and published by the American Society for Cell Biology, with funding from Howard Hughes Medical Institute. The journal publishes peer-reviewed articles on life sciences education research and evidence-based practice at the K-12, undergraduate, and graduate levels. One goal of the journal is to encourage teachers and instructors to view teaching and learning the way scientists view their research, as an intellectual undertaking that is informed by systematic collection, analysis, and interpretation of data related to student learning. Target audiences include those involved in education in K-12 schools, two-year colleges, four-year colleges, science centers and museums, universities, and professional schools, including graduate students and postdoctoral researchers. All published articles are available freely online without subscription. In addition, published articles are indexed in PubMed and available through PubMed Central. The journal's 2025 impact factor was 3.6.

Erin Dolan replaced William (Bill) Wood) as editor-in-chief on August 1, 2010. In 2013, the Genetics Society of America and American Society for Cell Biology announced an editorial partnership to collaborate on the publication of the journal. Now, the editors-in-chief is Miriam Segura.

== Abstracting and indexing ==
The journal is abstracted and indexed in:

Science Citation Index Expanded

PMC/MEDLINE/PubMed

Scopus

According to the Journal Citation Reports, the journal has a 2025 impact factor of 3.6.
