= Alfred Kühn =

German zoologist and geneticist (1885–1968)

- Born: Alfred Richard Wilhelm Kühn; 22 April 1885
- Died: 22 November 1968 (aged 83)
- Occupations: Zoologist and geneticist

Alfred Richard Wilhelm Kühn (22 April 1885 – 22 November 1968) was a German zoologist and geneticist. A student of August Weismann, he was one of the pioneers of developmental biology. At a period when biology was largely descriptive, he collaborated with zoologists, botanists, organic chemists, and physicists conducting interdisciplinary studies, examining sensory biology (colour vision), behaviour, and biochemistry through experiments on organisms.

== Life ==
Kühn was born in a family of physicians and academics. From 1904 to 1908 Alfred Kühn was as student of zoology and physiology in Freiburg. He received his habilitation in 1910. Starting in 1914 Kühn was associate professor at the University of Freiburg. His main academic influences were August Weismann (1834–1914) and Johannes von Kries (1853–1928). In 1914 he married Margaret Geiges (1888-1987), the daughter of the artist Fritz Geiges. The marriage remained childless. During World War I, he was drafted into military service, working on insect pests in the trenches. In 1918, Alfred Kühn was lecturer at the Humboldt University of Berlin. From 1920 on he was professor of zoology and genetics at the University of Göttingen. Among his major lines of investigation were the actions of genes in the development of organisms, particularly in the moth Ephestia kuehniella that he used as an experimental model. He collaborated with the botanist Fritz von Wettstein, the physicist Richard Pohl, the chemists Gottwalt Fischer and Adolf Butenandt. A major collaborator was his student Ernst Caspari who was employed by Kühn until 1935 when the Nazi administration dismissed him for being Jewish.

After the Nazi seizure of power, Kühn, together with Martin Staemmler and Friedrich Burgdörfer, authored the book Erbkunde, Rassenpflege, Bevölkerungspolitik. Schicksalsfragen des deutschen Volkes. In 1935 he received an evaluation by the Nazi government that says that he is doing his work in line with the Nazis, without feeling committed to the Nazi party. Starting 1937, Kühn was director of the Kaiser-Wilhelm-Institut für Biologie in Berlin-Dahlem. Besides his research he was editor of the Zeitschrift für induktive Abstammungs- und Vererbungslehre and later also in charge of genetics at Der Biologe, a journal that was taken over by the SS's race science think tank.

After World War II, already in 1945, he became a professor at the University of Tübingen. From 1951 to 1958 he returned as director of the Max Planck Institute for Biology—the post-war name for the Kaiser Wilhelm Institute for Biology, which had relocated to Tübingen in 1943.

== Work ==
Kühn's fields of research were genetics and physiology of development, especially of insects like Ephestia. He integrated experiments on development and heredity. He proposed a model of the gene-enzyme relation, which is important for the connection or mapping of genes to phenotypes.

Under study was the pigmentation of insect eyes. Together with his colleagues he realized that genes are not directly giving rise to physiological substances. Rather they found that there is a "primary reaction" which leads to enzymes. These enzymes then catalyze particular steps, eventually leading to pigments of the eye. Elements of today's evolutionary developmental biology are related to Kühn's work.

His lecture notes on developmental biology (Vorlesungen über Entwicklungsphysiologie) were a standard textbook.

== Honours ==
- 1966: Großes Verdienstkreuz mit Stern of Germany

== Bibliography ==
- Grundriß der allgemeinen Zoologie für Studierende. Thieme, Leipzig 1922; 17. Auflage 1969.
- Die Orientierung der Tiere im Raum. Fischer, Jena 1919.
- mit Hans Piepho: Über hormonale Wirkungen bei der Verpuppung der Schmetterlinge. In: Nachrichten von der Gesellschaft der Wissenschaften zu Göttingen. Mathematisch-physikalische Klasse, Fachgruppe 6, N. F., Bd. 2 (1936), Nr. 9, S. 141–154.
- Grundriß der Vererbungslehre. Quelle und Meyer, Leipzig 1939.
- Zur Entwicklungsphysiologie der Schmetterlingsmetamorphose. In: VII. Internationaler Kongress für Entomologie: Verhandlungen. Uschmann, Weimar 1939/40.
- Vorlesungen über Entwicklungsphysiologie. Springer, Berlin 1955. English translation by R. Milkman: Lectures in Developmental Physiology. Springer, New York 1971.
- Versuche zur Entwicklung eines Modells der Genwirkungen. In: Die Naturwissenschaften. Bd. 43 (Januar 1956), H. 2, S. 25–28, doi:10.1007/BF00637519.

== About ==
- Hansjochem Autrum [in German] (1982). "Kühn, Alfred". Neue Deutsche Biographie (in German). Vol. 13. Berlin: Duncker & Humblot. pp. 192–193. (full text online).
- Georg Birukow: Alfred Kühn. 22. April 1885 – 22. November 1968. In: Jahrbuch der Akademie der Wissenschaften in Göttingen. 1968, S. 83-85
- Manfred D. Laubichler, Hans-Jörg Rheinberger: Alfred Kühn (1885-1968) and developmental evolution. Journal of Experimental Zoology Part B: Molecular and Developmental Evolution 302B (2004) 103 - 110
