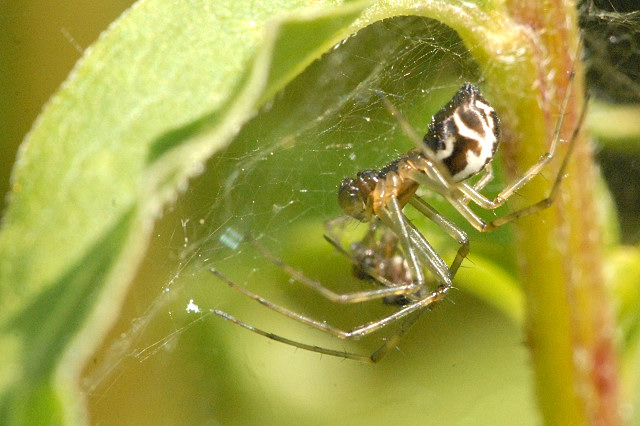
- F. frutetorum
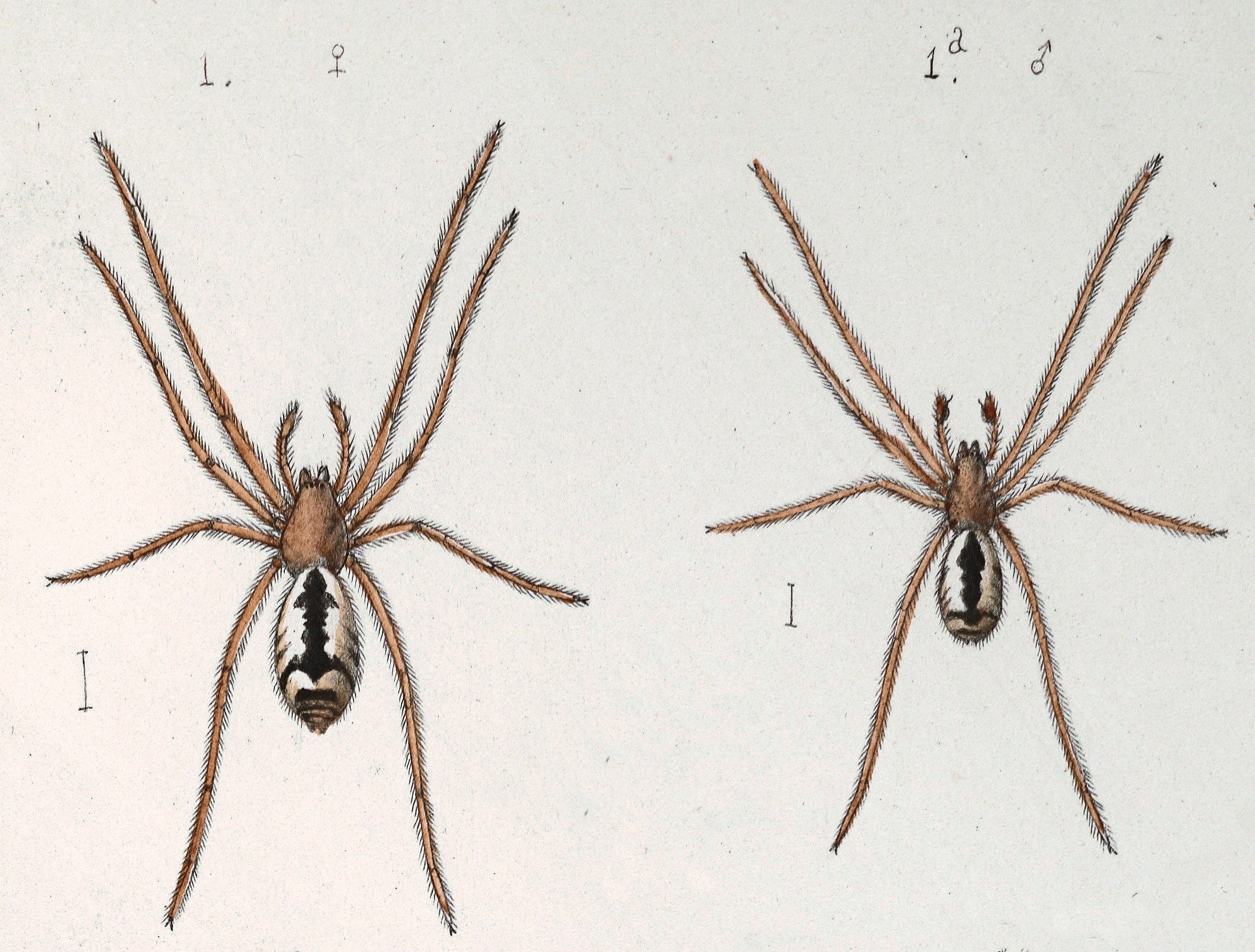
- F. frutetorum

Scientific classification
- Kingdom: Animalia
- Phylum: Arthropoda
- Subphylum: Chelicerata
- Class: Arachnida
- Order: Araneae
- Infraorder: Araneomorphae
- Family: Linyphiidae
- Genus: Frontinellina van Helsdingen, 1969

Type species
- F. frutetorum (C. L. Koch, 1835)

Species
- see text

= Frontinellina =

Genus of spiders

Frontinellina is a genus of sheet weavers that was first described by P. J. van Helsdingen in 1969.

Its four described species are found in Europe, Asia and Africa.

== Species ==
As of November 2025, this genus includes four species:

- Frontinellina dearmata (Kulczyński, 1899) – Madeira
- Frontinellina frutetorum (C. L. Koch, 1835) – Europe, North Africa, Turkey, Caucasus, Russia (Europe to South Siberia), Lebanon, Israel, Jordan, Iran, Kazakhstan, Central Asia (type species)
- Frontinellina gemalakaensis Irfan, Zhang & Peng, 2022 – China
- Frontinellina locketi van Helsdingen, 1970 – South Africa
