= Erin Dolan =

Biochemist and education researcher

Erin L. Dolan
- Born: Erin L. Peckol; 1971 (age 54–55)
- Education: University of California, San Francisco
- Scientific career
- Thesis: Developmental plasticity in the C. elegans nervous system (1999)

Erin Dolan is the Georgia Athletic Association Professor of Innovative Science Education at the University of Georgia. Dolan is a biochemist known for her research on engaging students in science research.

== Education and career ==
Dolan has a B.A. in biology from Wellesley College (1993) where she did an honors thesis on SCPb, a neurotransmitter in the American lobster. She earned a Ph.D. in neuroscience from the University of California, San Francisco where she worked on developmental plasticity in the nematode Caenorhabditis elegans. Following her Ph.D., she worked at the University of Arizona for two years before moving to Virginia Tech in 2002. In 2011, Dolan moved to the University of Georgia where she was named the Georgia Athletic Association Professor of Innovative Science Education in 2016. From 2014 until 2016 she was the executive director of the Texas Institute for Discovery Education in Science at the University of Texas at Austin.

In 2010 Dolan was named Editor-in-chief of the journal CBE: Life Sciences Education.

== Research ==
As a neuroscientist, Dolan worked on sensory signalling, gene expression, and nerve development in the nematode Caenorhabditis elegans. Following her graduate work, Dolan started researching science education where she focuses on the development of programs to increase retention of students in science disciplines and how social and cultural phenomena impact student learning and development, particularly in course-based undergraduate research experiences called CUREs.

=== Selected publications ===
- Auchincloss, Lisa Corwin; Laursen, Sandra L.; Branchaw, Janet L.; Eagan, Kevin; Graham, Mark; Hanauer, David I.; Lawrie, Gwendolyn; McLinn, Colleen M.; Pelaez, Nancy; Rowland, Susan; Towns, Marcy; Trautmann, Nancy M.; Varma-Nelson, Pratibha; Weston, Timothy J.; Dolan, Erin L. (1 March 2014). "Assessment of Course-Based Undergraduate Research Experiences: A Meeting Report". CBE: Life Sciences Education. 13 (1): 29–40. doi:10.1187/cbe.14-01-0004. PMC 3940459. PMID 24591501.
- Maricq, Andres V.; Peckol, Erin; Driscoll, Monica; Bargmann, Cornelia I. (November 1995). "Mechanosensory signalling in C. elegans mediated by the GLR-1 glutamate receptor". Nature. 378 (6552): 78–81. Bibcode:1995Natur.378...78M. doi:10.1038/378078a0. ISSN 1476-4687. PMID 7477293. S2CID 4261322.
- Peckol, Erin L.; Troemel, Emily R.; Bargmann, Cornelia I. (25 September 2001). "Sensory experience and sensory activity regulate chemosensory receptor gene expression in Caenorhabditis elegans". Proceedings of the National Academy of Sciences. 98 (20): 11032–11038. Bibcode:2001PNAS...9811032P. doi:10.1073/pnas.191352498. PMC 58678. PMID 11572964.
- Dolan, Erin; Johnson, Deborah (16 May 2009). "Toward a Holistic View of Undergraduate Research Experiences: An Exploratory Study of Impact on Graduate/Postdoctoral Mentors". Journal of Science Education and Technology. 18 (6): 487. Bibcode:2009JSEdT..18..487D. doi:10.1007/s10956-009-9165-3. ISSN 1573-1839. S2CID 54600427.

== Awards and honors ==
- Bruce Alberts Award for Excellence in Science Education (2018)
- Award for Exemplary Contributions to Education, American Society for Biochemistry and Molecular Biology (2017)
- Excellence in Education of the American Society of Plant Biologists (2013)
