= L. C. Dunn =

American geneticist (1893–1974)

- Born: November 2, 1893; Buffalo, New York
- Died: March 19, 1974 (aged 80); North Tarrytown, New York
- Education: Dartmouth College, Harvard University
- Known for: Principles of Genetics, studies of Drosophila mutations
- Spouse: Louise Porter
- Children: Robert Leslie Dunn, Stephen Porter Dunn
- Scientific career
- Fields: Developmental genetics
- Institutions: Storrs Agricultural Experiment Station, Columbia University

Leslie Clarence Dunn (November 2, 1893 in Buffalo, New York – March 19, 1974) was a developmental geneticist at Columbia University. His early work with the mouse T-locus and established ideas of gene interaction, fertility factors, and allelic distribution. Later work with other model organisms continued to contribute to developmental genetics. Dunn was also an activist, helping fellow scientists seek asylum during World War II, and a critic of eugenics movements.

== Biography ==
Dunn was born in Buffalo, New York, in 1893, to Clarence Leslie Dunn and Mary Eliza Booth Dunn. He earned a bachelor's degree from Dartmouth College in 1915.

Dunn served in the Harvard Regiment in France during World War I, and after the war, returned to Harvard University to complete his degree in 1920. After the war, he identified as a pacifist. He worked from 1920 to 1928 as a poultry geneticist at the Storrs Agricultural Experiment Station in Connecticut, publishing almost fifty papers during this time.

Dunn, along with colleague E. W. Sinnott, was the author of one of the foremost early genetics texts, Principles of Genetics (first published in 1925).

In 1928 Dunn was invited to join Columbia University as a full professor in the Zoology Department. While there, he was renowned for his teaching, expanded his work somewhat into Drosophila (discovering mutations including Minute and Bar), and influenced numerous students, included "outstanding" developmental biologists Salome Gluecksohn-Waelsch and Dorothea Bennett, and worked with Ann Chester Chandley.

Dunn was married to Louise Porter, a Smith College graduate, and the couple had two children, Robert Leslie Dunn (b. 1921) and Stephen Porter Dunn (b. 1928). Dunn and his family loved literature and poetry, as did Dunn's mother, and established a press (Coalbin Press) to publish occasional volumes of poetry. The younger son, Stephen, was a social anthropologist and writer, publishing books such as The Peasants of Central Russia (1967) and Introduction to Soviet Ethnography (1974) (with his wife Ethel Deikman Dunn), Cultural Processes in the Baltic Area Under Soviet Rule (1966), and edited, translated, and taught.

He died on March 19, 1974, at Phelps Memorial Hospital in North Tarrytown, New York.

== Significant papers and contributions ==
- Dunn, L.C. 1920. "Independent Genes in Mice", Genetics, v.5, pp. 344–361.
- Dunn, L.C. 1920. "Linkage in mice and rats", Genetics, v.5, pp. 325–343. (Dunn's dissertation at Harvard)
- Dunn, L.C. 1957. "Evidence of evolutionary forces leading to the spread of lethal genes in wild populations of house mice", Proc. Natl. Acad. Sci. USA v.43, pp. 158–163.
- Dunn, L. C. 1959. "Heredity and Evolution in Human Populations", v.75, pp. 117–192.
- Dunn, L.C. 1964. "Abnormalities associated with a chromosome region in the mouse", Science, v.144, pp. 260–263.
- Dunn, L.C. and W.C. Morgan. 1952. "A mutable locus in wild populations of house mice", Am. Nat. v.86, pp. 321–323.
- Dunn, L.C., H. Gruneberg, and G.D. Snell. 1940. "Report of the Committee on Mouse Genetics Nomenclature", J. Hered. v.31, pp. 505–506.
- Dunn, L.C. 1951. Race and Biology: The Race Question in Modern Science (UNESCO, 1951; 3rd edition 1970)
- Heredity, Race, and Society (1946; fourth edition 1972)
- A Short History of Genetics (1965)
- Organizer, with Milislav Demerec, The Cold Spring Harbor Symposia, 1940s-1950s

== Awards and honors ==
- U.S. National Academy of Sciences (elected 1943)
- American Philosophical Society (1943)
- American Academy of Arts and Sciences (1950)
- Norwegian Academy of Sciences
- Italian Academia Pataviana
- Founding member, Genetics Society of America
- President, Genetics Society of America, 1932
- President, American Society of Naturalists, 1960
- President, American Society of Human Genetics, 1961

== Further research ==
- American Philosophical Society, L. C. Dunn Biography
- William deJong-Lambert, The Cold War Politics of Genetic Research: An Introduction to the Lysenko Affair, Chapter 1, Sections 1.4: "Julian Huxley and Leslie Clarence Dunn" and 1.5 "J. B. S. Haldane, and Dunn's Visit to the Soviet Union".
- Theodosius Dobzhansky, Leslie Clarence Dunn, 1893-1974: A Biographical Memoir (National Academy of Sciences 1978)
- Melinda Gormley, "Geneticist L.C. Dunn: Politics, Activism, and Community" (Oregon State University PhD Thesis 2007)
- Michael Gordin How Lysenkoism Became Pseudoscience: Dobzhansky to Velikovsky, Journal of the History of Biology (2012) 45:443-468.
- M. Gormley, "Scientific Discrimination and the Activist Scientist", J. Hist. Biol., v.42, n.1, pp. 33–72 (Spring 2009).
- Mary F. Lyon, "L. C. Dunn and Mouse Genetic Mapping", Genetics (1990). "Perspectives: Anecdotal, Historical and Critical Commentaries on Genetics", edited by James F. Crow and William F. Dove.
- "L. C. Dunn Papers", A Guide to the Genetics Collections at the American Philosophical Society: Major Collections. See also L. C. Dunn Papers - Table of Contents.
