= Sarah Elgin =

American biologist

Sarah C.R. Elgin
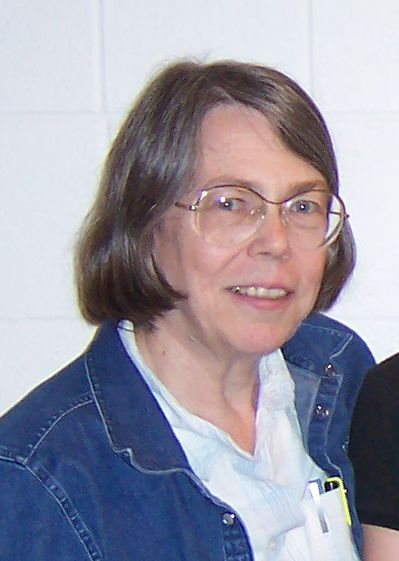
- Sarah C.R. Elgin
- Education: Pomona College; California Institute of Technology
- Known for: heterochromatin, science education
- Awards: Faculty Award, Council of Students of Arts and Sciences, WU, 1997; Fellows Award, Academy of Science of St. Louis, 2000; Bruce Alberts Award (with M. Campbell) for Excellence in Science Education, ASCB, 2006; Award for Exemplary Contributions to Education, ASBMB, 2007; Elizabeth W. Jones Award for Excellence in Education, GSA, 2009; Member, American Academy of Arts and Sciences, elected 2012; Doctor of Science, Honoris Causa, Pomona College, 2017; Member, National Academy of Sciences, elected 2018; Arthur Holly Compton Faculty Achievement Award, Washington University in St. Louis, 2018
- Scientific career
- Fields: Biochemistry, Cell Biology, Genetics, Epigenetics
- Workplaces: California Institute of Technology; Harvard University; Washington University in St. Louis
- Doctoral advisor: James Bonner
- Other academic advisors: Leroy Hood
- Doctoral students: Lee M. Silver; Carl Wu; Thomas Dietz; Karmella Haynes

Sarah C.R. Elgin is an American biochemist and geneticist. She is the Viktor Hamburger Distinguished Professor Emerita of Arts and Sciences, and Professor Emerita of Biology at Washington University in St. Louis. She is noted for her work in epigenetics, gene regulation, and heterochromatin, and for her contributions to science education.

== Early life and education ==
Sarah "Sally" Elgin was born in Washington, D.C. She grew up in Salem, Oregon. In high school, Elgin became fascinated with chemistry and became a finalist in the national Westinghouse Science Talent Search in 1963. She received her B.A. in chemistry from Pomona College in 1967. While at Pomona, she participated in a summer research program at the University of Leeds characterizing the egg stalk of the green lacewing fly Chrysopa vittata. Elgin did her graduate work in the lab of James Bonner at the California Institute of Technology, isolating and characterizing nonhistone chromosomal proteins from rat livers and other sources. She received her Ph.D. in biochemistry in 1972. Elgin stayed at California Institute of Technology for her postdoctoral research, working in the lab of Leroy Hood. She continued to isolate and characterize nonhistone chromosomal proteins but started using Drosophila as a model system, inspired by the ability to combine biochemistry, cytology, and genetics in flies.

== Academic career and research ==
After her postdoc, Elgin joined the faculty in the Department of Biochemistry and Molecular Biology at Harvard University, where her lab pioneered immunostaining of polytene chromosomes from Drosophila larval salivary glands and nuclease digestion assays to determine organizational patterns of nucleosomes at active and inactive genes.

In 1981, Elgin joined the faculty in the Department of Biology at Washington University in St. Louis. Her lab identified and characterized Heterochromatin Protein 1 in Drosophila (now known as Su(var)205 or HP1a) and demonstrated that it is essential for heterochromatin formation. To probe chromatin environments, her lab developed a P element construct with a copy of the white gene driven by the hsp70 promoter. When this reporter gene is inserted into heterochromatic environments, the fly eyes display a variegating phenotype, whereas when the P element is inserted into euchromatin the fly eyes show a red phenotype; this phenomenon is known as Position-Effect Variegation. Use of this system enabled characterization of unique structural features of heterochromatin.

At Washington University, in the St. Louis area, and nationally, Elgin has been active in science education. She founded the Washington University Science Outreach program (now the Institute for K-12 School Partnership) in 1989 and has been active in science education in the University City school district. She also lobbied for the establishment of the Office of Undergraduate Research at Washington University and promoted the incorporation of research into undergraduate lab courses. In 2006, Elgin was named as the inaugural Viktor Hamburger Distinguished Professor of Arts and Sciences.

Examining Flies

== Genomics Education Partnership ==
In 2002, Elgin became an HHMI Professor with the goal to develop core curriculum to integrate primary research in genomics into a college lab course called "Research Explorations in Genomics." In June 2005, Elgin held a one-day hands-on introductory workshop at Washington University in St. Louis to show visiting faculty what her students were able to do in genome annotation. The 17 faculty who attended all signed on to a proposal to the Howard Hughes Medical Institute (HHMI) to establish the Genomics Education Partnership (GEP). The HHMI grant was funded, and GEP’s first cohort of members attended a full training workshop in June 2006.

Starting from the laboratory course at Washington University, the GEP has engaged students in improving the sequence and gene annotation of different species of Drosophila fruit flies, initially focusing on the F Element, a small chromosome that is largely heterochromatic, but has 80 transcribed genes. The GEP has grown into a consortium of over 200 faculty members from colleges and universities, now led by Professor Laura Reed (University of Alabama). GEP students participate in gene annotation projects with the goal of publishing results in primary research journals. GEP faculty also collaborate to publish data on learning experiences for students taking research-intensive classes based on the GEP approach.

== Awards and honors ==
- Bruce Alberts Award for Excellence in Science Education (American Society for Cell Biology), 2006, shared with A. Malcolm Campbell
- Award for Exemplary Contributions to Education (American Society for Biochemistry and Molecular Biology), 2007
- Elizabeth W. Jones Award for Excellence in Education (Genetics Society of America), 2009
- American Academy of Arts and Sciences, 2012
- National Academy of Sciences, 2018
