= Devimistat =

Chemical compound

Clinical data
- Other names: CPI-613

Legal status
- Legal status: Investigational

Identifiers
- IUPAC name: 6,8-Bis(benzylsulfanyl)octanoic acid
- CAS Number: 95809-78-2
- PubChem CID: 24770514
- DrugBank: 12109
- ChemSpider: 28189062
- UNII: E76113IR49
- ChEBI: CHEBI:233197
- ChEMBL: ChEMBL3186849
- CompTox Dashboard (EPA): DTXSID70914807
- ECHA InfoCard: 100.231.125

Chemical and physical data
- Formula: C_{22}H_{28}O_{2}S_{2}
- Molar mass: 388.58 g·mol^{−1}
- 3D model (JSmol): Interactive image
- SMILES: C1=CC=C(C=C1)CSCCC(CCCCC(=O)O)SCC2=CC=CC=C2
- InChI: InChI=1S/C22H28O2S2/c23-22(24)14-8-7-13-21(26-18-20-11-5-2-6-12-20)15-16-25-17-19-9-3-1-4-10-19/h1-6,9-12,21H,7-8,13-18H2,(H,23,24); Key:ZYRLHJIMTROTBO-UHFFFAOYSA-N

Devimistat (INN; development code CPI-613) is an experimental anti-mitochondrial drug being developed by Cornerstone Pharmaceuticals. It is being studied for the treatment of patients with metastatic pancreatic cancer and relapsed or refractory acute myeloid leukemia (AML).

Devimistat's mechanism of action differs from other drugs, operating on the tricarboxylic acid cycle and inhibiting enzymes involved with cancer cell energy metabolism. A lipoic acid derivative different from standard cytotoxic chemotherapy, devimistat is currently being studied in combination with modified FOLFIRINOX to treat various solid tumors and heme malignancies.

== Regulation ==
The U.S. Food and Drug Administration (FDA) has designated devimistat as an orphan drug for the treatment of pancreatic cancer, AML, myelodysplastic syndromes (MDS), peripheral T-cell lymphoma, and Burkitt's lymphoma, and given approval to initiate clinical trials in pancreatic cancer and AML.

== Clinical trials ==
Clinical trials of the drug are underway including a Phase III open-label clinical trial to evaluate efficacy and safety of devimistat plus modified FOLFIRINOX (mFFX) versus FOLFIRINOX (FFX) in patients with metastatic adenocarcinoma of the pancreas.
