= G3: Genes, Genomes, Genetics =

- Discipline: Genetics
- Language: English
- Edited by: Brenda Andrews

Publication details
- History: 2011–present
- Publisher: Genetics Society of America (United States)
- Frequency: Monthly
- Open access: Yes
- License: Creative Commons Attribution License
- Impact factor: 2.4 (2025)

Standard abbreviations
- ISO 4: G3: Genes Genomes Genet.
- NLM: G3 (Bethesda)

Indexing
- CODEN: GGGGBN
- ISSN: 2160-1836
- LCCN: 2011200039
- OCLC no.: 704284671

Links
- Journal homepage; Online access; Online archive

G3: Genes, Genomes, Genetics (also styled as G3: Genes | Genomes | Genetics) is a peer-reviewed open-access scientific journal that focuses on rapid publication of research in the fields of genetics and genomics. It is published by the Genetics Society of America and was established in 2011. The journal is abstracted and indexed in MEDLINE and the Science Citation Index Expanded. The founding editor-in-chief is Brenda Andrews (University of Toronto).

== See also ==
- Genetics
