= Dorothea Bennett =

Geneticist

- Born: December 27, 1929; Honolulu, Hawaii
- Died: August 16, 1990 (aged 60); Houston, Texas
- Education: Barnard College, Columbia University
- Known for: Genetics of early mammalian development
- Awards: Honorary doctorate from the Faculty of Medicine at Uppsala University (1981)
- Scientific career
- Fields: Genetics
- Institutions: Department of Zoology at Columbia; Cornell University Medical College; Sloan-Kettering Institute for Cancer Research; University of Texas, Austin

Dorothea Bennett (December 27, 1929 in Honolulu, Hawaii – August 16, 1990 in Houston, Texas) was a geneticist, known for the genetics of early mammalian development and for research into mammalian sperm surface structures and their role in fertilization and spermatogenesis. She was "one of the major figures in mouse developmental genetics".

== Biography ==
She was born on Oahu, Hawaii. She earned a bachelor's degree from Barnard College in 1951 and a doctorate from Columbia University in 1956. She was in the Department of Zoology at Columbia from 1956 to 1962, where she worked with L. C. Dunn and visiting researcher Ann Chester Chandley. Bennett left to join Cornell University Medical College in 1962, where she remained until 1976. From 1976 to 1986 she was at the Sloan-Kettering Institute for Cancer Research.

Bennett moved to the University of Texas in Austin in 1986, where she was the Alfred W. Roark Centennial Professor and chair of the zoology department, and helped establish the graduate program in molecular biology.

She died of lymphoma in Texas, August 16, 1990.

== Notable publications ==
- "The T-locus of the Mouse", Cell (1975)
- "Serological Demonstration of H–Y (Male) Antigen on Mouse Sperm", Ellen H. Goldberg, Edward A. Boyse, Dorothea Bennett, Margrit Scheid, and Elizabeth A. Carswell. v.232, pp. 478–480 (Aug. 13, 1971). doi:10.1038/232478a0
- "Developmental analysis of a mutation with pleiotropic effects in the mouse", Journal of Morphology (1956)
- "Gene mapping within the T/t complex of the mouse. II. Anomalous position of the H-2 complex in t haplotypes", K Artzt, HS Shin, D Bennett, Cell (1982)
- "Analogies between embryonic (T/t) antigens and adult major histocompatibility (H-2) antigens", K Artzt, D Bennett, Nature (1975)
- "A major testicular cell protein specified by a mouse T/t complex gene", LM Silver, K Artzt, D Bennett, Cell (2006)
- Current Topics in Developmental Biology, v.18: Genome Functions, Cell Interactions, and Differentiation (Academic Press: Feb. 28, 1983)
- Bennett, Dorothea (1977). "L.C. Dunn and His Contribution to T-Locus Genetics". Annual Review of Genetics. 11 (1). Annual Reviews: 1–12. doi:10.1146/annurev.ge.11.120177.000245. ISSN 0066-4197. PMID 339812.

== Awards ==
- honorary doctorate from the Faculty of Medicine at Uppsala University, Sweden (1981).

== Further research ==
- "Dorothea Bennett, 60, Geneticist and Teacher" (obituary), The New York Times, Aug. 18, 1990.
- "In Memoriam: Dorothea Bennett", University of Texas (1990)
- Karen Artzt, "In Memoriam Dorothea Bennett 1929–1990", Immunogenetics, v.33, n.1 (1991), pp. 1–3. DOI 10.1007/BF00211688
- Theodosius Dobzhansky, Leslie Clarence Dunn, 1893-1974: A Biographical Memoir (National Academy of Sciences 1978) (significant discussion of L. C. Dunn's and Dorothea Bennett's collaborations)
- Lee M. Silver, "In Memoriam: Dorothea Bennett, 1929–1990", Mammalian Genome, v.1, n.2 (1991), pp. 69–70. DOI 10.1007/BF02443780
- "Obituaries", The Scientist Magazine, Sept. 17, 1990.
- Marilyn Ogilvie and Joy Harvey, Biographical Dictionary of Women in Science
