= Stephen Porter Dunn =

American poet (1928–1999)

Stephen Porter Dunn (March 24, 1928 – June 4, 1999, Kensington, California) was a U.S. anthropologist specializing in ethnic groups of the Soviet Union. He translated and edited a number of works on the topic from the Russian language, and lectured in several universities. Apart from his involvement with academia, he was a poet and issued several collections of verse.

== Biography ==
The youngest of two sons of geneticist L. C. Dunn and Louise P. Dunn, Stephen lived his life with cerebral palsy. His parents provided him with the opportunity to travel in Norway, Sweden, France, England, Ireland, and Italy as a boy and young man.

Dunn was educated at Lincoln School of Columbia University, Columbia College, and Columbia University, where he received his Ph.D. in anthropology in 1959. Margaret Mead was on his thesis committee.

Dunn's earliest publications were books of poetry, including, as S. P. Dunn, Some Watercolors from Venice (1956), and ending with The Recluse and Other Poems (1999). Several of his scholarly publications, some of them with his father L. C. Dunn, were devoted to the Roman Jews.

Dunn wrote four books: Cultural Processes in the Baltic Area under Soviet Rule (1966), The Peasants of Central Russia (with his wife Ethel Dunn 1967, reissued 1988), Kulturwandel im sowjetischen Dorf, (with Ethel Dunn 1977), and The Fall and Rise of the Asiatic Mode of Production (1982). He also wrote over 100 articles, book reviews, and commentary.

In spite of a widely held opinion that due to his disease, Dunn could not teach, he did teach courses in the peoples of the USSR (at Monterey Institute of Foreign Studies, 1970–74, at the University of California, Berkeley, 1980, and San Francisco State University) and comparative religion. The latter gave him particular satisfaction, since it was his favorite field.

For 25 years starting in 1962, Dunn was the editor of Soviet Anthropology and Archeology and Soviet Sociology, translation journals published by M. E. Sharpe, Inc. He translated from Russian, Man and His Work (1970, which he also edited), Soviet Far East in Antiquity (1965), and Yakutia Before its Incorporation into the Russian State (1970) by A. P. Okladnikov, as well as three books by Alexander Yanov, The Russian New Right (1978), The Origins of Autocracy (1981), and The Drama of the Soviet 1960s: A Lost Reform (1984).

Dunn edited a number of translations, including The Peoples of Siberia (1964), Introduction to Soviet Ethnography (two volumes, with Ethel Dunn, 1974), Ethel Dunn's translation of A. I. Klibanov, The History of Religious Sectarianism in Russia (1860s-1917) (1981), and he revised the English translation of Popular Beliefs and Folklore Traditions in Siberia, edited by V. Dioszegi (1968).

== Family ==
On October 6, 1956, Dunn married Ethel Deikman, who also had cerebral palsy.

At the time of his death, Dunn was survived by his wife, two nieces, a nephew, two great-nieces and a great-nephew. He was also close to Ethel's niece, and her children, another niece and her children, a nephew, and Ethel's brother.
