= Carl Wu =

- Citizenship: American
- Education: Saint Mary's College of California (BA); Harvard University (PhD)
- Awards: National Academy of Medicine (2010) National Academy of Sciences (2006); American Academy of Arts and Sciences; European Molecular Biology Organization Academia Sinica
- Scientific career
- Fields: Molecular Biology, Genetics, Biochemistry
- Institutions: Johns Hopkins University (Since 2016); Howard Hughes Medical Institute (2012-2016); National Cancer Institute (1982-2012)

Carl Wu is a Chinese-American scientist, and a Bloomberg Distinguished Professor of biology, molecular biology and genetics at Johns Hopkins University. He is active in the fields of chromatin and gene expression.

== Early life and education ==
Carl Wu was born in Hong Kong. Wu attended St. Joseph's High School in Hong Kong and won a scholarship to attend Saint Mary's College of California. He began his research in chromatin biology while pursuing his doctorate at Harvard University, under Sarah Elgin. Subsequently, Wu completed his post-doc as a Junior fellow of the Harvard Society of Fellows under Nobel laureate Walter Gilbert, where he provided the first evidence for DNase hypersensitive sites at cellular gene promoters.

== Career ==
=== National Cancer Institute and HHMI ===
In 1982, Wu joined the National Cancer Institute within the National Institutes of Health. Here he began investigating the biochemical mechanism of chromatin remodeling. In 1994, his group discovered that enzymatic activity was necessary for creating accessible DNA sites on chromatin. The following year his lab purified and characterized the responsible chromatin remodeling enzyme called NURF. This work was recognized by Nature as a breakthrough discovery in the field of gene expression. Wu went on to become the chief of the Laboratory for Molecular Cell Biology at the cancer institute; then chief of the Laboratory of Biochemistry and Molecular Biology.

In 2012, Wu joined Janelia Research Campus of the Howard Hughes Medical Institute as a Senior Fellow of the Transcription Imaging Consortium.

=== Johns Hopkins University ===
In 2016, Wu joined the Johns Hopkins University as the 23rd Bloomberg Distinguished Professor. His appointment bridges the Department of Biology in JHU's Zanvyl Krieger School of Arts and Sciences and the Department of Molecular Biology and Genetics in the School of Medicine. Through this interdisciplinary appointment, Wu combined his research efforts in biochemistry and live cell imaging into a single unified effort.

== Awards ==
Wu was elected as a member of the National Academy of Sciences in 2006 and the National Academy of Medicine in 2010. He is also a Member of Academia Sinica and the European Molecular Biology Organization, and a fellow of the American Academy of Arts and Sciences.

== Publications ==
Wu has more than 30,000 citations in Google Scholar and an h-index of 83.

- Pubmed citations
- Google Scholar citations

=== Selected articles ===
- 1995, Heat shock transcription factors: structure and regulation, in: Annual Review of Cell and Developmental Biology. Vol. 11, nº 1; 441–469.
- 2004 with G Mizuguchi, X Shen, J Landry, S Sen, ATP-driven exchange of histone H2AZ variant catalyzed by SWR1 chromatin remodeling complex, in: Science. Vol. 303; nº 5656; 343–348.
- 1980, The 5′ ends of Drosophila heat shock genes in chromatin are hypersensitive to DNase I, in: Nature. Vol. 286, nº 5776; 854–860.
- 2006 with J Wysocka, T Swigut, H Xiao, TA Milne, SY Kwon, J Landry, M Kauer, AJ Tackett, BT Chait, P Badenhorst, CD Allis, A PHD finger of NURF couples histone H3 lysine 4 trimethylation with chromatin remodelling, in: Nature. Vol. 42, nº 7098; 86–90.
- 2000 with X Shen, G Mizuguchi, A Hamiche, A chromatin remodelling complex involved in transcription and DNA processing, in: Nature. Vol. 406, nº 6795; 541–544.
- 1995 with T Tsukiyama, Purification and properties of an ATP-dependent nucleosome remodeling factor, in: Cell. Vol. 83, nº 6; 1011–1020.
