= Jrk =

Fruit fly gene

Identifiers
- Organism: D. melanogaster
- Symbol: Jrk
- Alt. symbols: bHLHe10, CG7391, clk, CLK, clock, CLOCK, dClck, dclk, dClk, dCLK, dCLK/JRK, dClock, dCLOCK, Dmel/CG7391, Jerk, jrk, Jrk, PAS 1
- Entrez: 38872
- RefSeq (mRNA): NM_001014576
- RefSeq (Prot): NP_001014576
- UniProt: O61735

Other data
- Chromosome: 3L: 7.76 - 7.78 Mb
Search for
- Structures: Swiss-model
- Domains: InterPro

dClock (clk) is a gene located on the 3L chromosome of Drosophila melanogaster. Mapping and cloning of the gene indicates that it is the Drosophila homolog of the mouse gene CLOCK (mClock). The Jrk mutation disrupts the transcription cycling of per and tim and manifests dominant effects.

== Discovery ==
Discovered at Brandeis University in 1998, cloning the mutant Jrk led to the identification of the drosophila homolog of the mammalian Clock gene in DNA.

== Jrk mutation ==
Jrk is a mutation of a gene (not to be confused with JRKL) discovered by Michael Rosbash and his colleagues in 1998. A common misconception is that the Jrk mutant gene is the Drosophila homolog of CLOCK (mClock), which disrupts cycling transcription of the per and tim genes. The Jrk mutation was discovered before dClock, but it is a mutation of dClock. Jrk is a semi-dominant third chromosome mutant displaying arrhythmic, or not rhythmic, locomotor behavior in constant darkness. It's been found that Jrk mutant flies are less robust to changes in the environment, such as temperature increases, than animals with the wild type dClock gene. The mutant flies also have differing light sensitivity and behavior patterns, suggesting that dClock is important in controlling coupled oscillators. The mutation in dClock that makes Jrk is from a premature stop codon that truncates the protein, deleting most of the putative C-terminal activation domain of the bHLH-PAS transcription factor. This is consistent with the mammalian clock mutant phenotype.

== Structure ==
Through complementation testing of Jrk with various deletions done by Allada et al., Jrk was found to be located on the left arm of chromosome 3, specifically at location 66A10-22.

Start site: 7,763,233

Stop site: 7,775,603

The dClock gene has a PAS domain between positions 90-156, and positions 255-321. These regions are important for allowing proteins to recognize and associate with one another, forming dimers. This is followed by a C-terminal PAC motif starting at position 327 and ending at 370. PAC motifs have been proposed to contribute to the PAS domain fold.

The gene also has a bHLH domain starting at position 21 and ending at position 71. This means that it binds specific DNA sequences, the E-box consensus sequence in this case, that regulate transcription. This domain is a 60 amino acid region with a DNA binding domain, which is followed by two amphipathic alpha-helices which are connected by a loop, forming the HLH motif. This region is also important in protein dimerization, which is necessary for DNA binding.

The gene has 5 transcripts, which encode for 4 unique polypeptides. It has 9 exons. The transcript of the gene is about 5000kB long, as determined through utilization of northern blot techniques. The polypeptide that the transcript encodes for has a reported size between 1015 and 1027 amino acids, and a molecular weight between 130 and 150kD.

== Function ==
=== Circadian clock ===
In Drosophila, there are two main players in the generation of circadian rhythms: the period (per) gene and timeless (tim). These two genes are responsible for the oscillations in protein levels, RNA levels, and transcription rates that occur in flies.

Another essential component of this circadian clock mechanism is that the PER protein contains a PAS domain, which has been demonstrated to mediate the interactions between transcription factors. These transcription factors also contain the well-characterized basic helix-loop-helix (bHLH) DNA-binding domains. Furthermore, in mice an E box (CACGTG) was discovered, which acts a binding site for some of the bHLH transcription factors, which includes bHLH-PAS transcription factors.

=== Jrk mutant phenotypes ===
The mutant Jrk allele is a consequence of a point mutation, which is simply the insertion, deletion, or swapping of one nucleotide base in an mRNA sequence for another. This mutation exhibits a dominant negative effect, meaning that just one copy of it is enough to produce phenotypic deviation. The Jrk mutation deletes much of the gene that encodes for the glutamine (Q)-rich C terminus of the protein. This region is involved in transcriptional activation, which is necessary to allow mRNA to be transcribed from DNA in the nucleus. It can be achieved by utilizing ethyl methanesulfonate (EMS) as a mutagen. The mutation results in a cytosine being swapped for a thymine at the 7764959 position (C7764959T). This substitution causes what was initially encoded as a glutamine to be swapped for a premature stop codon, preventing further translation of the gene.

Jrk was identified as a homozygous mutant with completely arrhythmic locomotor behavior in constant darkness. Approximately half of all of the Jrk heterozygotes were arrhythmic, and those that did manifest a rhythm had a slightly longer period than the wild-type controls.

Researchers also observed that both PER and TIM levels are extremely low and non-cycling in homozygous Jrk flies, approximately equivalent to the trough levels of wild-type flies. In heterozygotes, PER and TIM cycle well, but the amplitude is reduced by approximately 50%, consistent with the clear effects on behavioral rhythmicity in these flies.

== Mammalian homologs of dClock ==
The Jrk gene has a myriad of homologs throughout the natural world, with 642 orthologs and 3 paralogs. Mammal circadian systems contain the Clock gene which has been shown to be closely related to dClock. Both have strikingly similar bHLH domains, which suggests that they associate with similar, if not identical, DNA targets. The PAS region is also highly conserved between drosophila and mice. This suggests that both Jrk and its mouse homolog have conserved heterodimeric partners.

Mammalian mutations in the Clock gene have been found to result in autism spectrum disorder, schizophrenia, attention‐deficit/hyperactivity disorder, major depressive disorder, bipolar disorder, anxiety disorder, and substance use disorder.

== See also ==
- Clock gene
- Period (gene)
- Cycle (gene)
- Timeless (gene)
- Chronobiology
- Oscillating gene
- Michael Rosbash
- TTFL
