= Dan Lindsley =

American geneticist (1925–2018)

Dan Lindsley (October 13, 1925 – June 22, 2018) was an American geneticist known for his Drosophila research.

Lindsley was born on October 13, 1925, and raised in Pasadena California. He attended the University of Texas while serving in the United States Navy during World War II, and pursued a medical degree at the University of Arkansas for Medical Sciences. A. B. Griffen, whom Lindsley first met in Texas, convinced him to transfer to the University of Missouri School of Medicine. There, Lindsley left medicine for biology. After earning his bachelor's and master's degree, Lindsley began doctoral study at the California Institute of Technology in 1949, and completed the program in 1952. Subsequently, he worked at Oak Ridge National Laboratory. Lindsley began teaching at University of California, San Diego in 1967, and retired in 1991. He was elected to the National Academy of Sciences in 1974 and the American Academy of Arts and Sciences in 1975. In 2000, he received the Distinguished Alumni Award from the California Institute of Technology (Caltech). He continued academic research decades into retirement. Lindsley died in La Jolla, California, on June 22, 2018, aged 92.
