= Howard Nash =

American biochemist and geneticist

Howard Nash (1937–2011) was a geneticist who spent his research career at the National Institute of Mental Health, part of the United States National Institutes of Health. Nash received his M.D. and Ph.D. in biochemistry from the University of Chicago. He briefly did clinical work in pediatrics before joining NIMH in 1964. His early research focused on the molecular biology of a model bacteriophage (a virus that infects bacteria) known as lambda phage. He was particularly interested in mechanisms of DNA recombination and DNA repair. Later, he began to study the molecular mechanisms of inhalational anesthetics using Drosophila as a model system, especially focusing on genetic variations in response.

Nash was elected to the American Academy of Arts and Sciences in 1988 and to the National Academy of Sciences in 1990.
