= Genetics Society of America =

US scientific learned society

- Founded: 1930; 96 years ago
- Tax ID no.: 93-6023830
- Location(s): 6210 Executive Boulevard; Suite 550; Rockville, Maryland 20852
- Method: Journals, symposiums, education, and membership.
- Members: 5,500+
- President: Mariana Wolfner
- Executive Director: Tracey de Pellegrin
- Revenue: $3,950,041 (2013)
- Expenses: $3,463,720 (2013)
- Endowment: $26,756
- Employees: 0 (2013)
- Volunteers: 14 (2013)
- Website: www.genetics-gsa.org

The Genetics Society of America (GSA) is a scholarly membership society of more than 5,500 genetics researchers and educators, established in 1931. The Society was formed from the reorganization of the Joint Genetics Sections of the American Society of Zoologists and the Botanical Society of America.

GSA members conduct fundamental and applied research using a wide variety of model organisms to enhance understanding of living systems. Some of the systems of study include Drosophila (fruit flies), Caenorhabditis elegans (nematode roundworms), yeasts, zebrafish, humans, mice, bacteria, Arabidopsis thaliana (thale cress), maize (corn), Chlamydomonas (green algae), Xenopus (frogs), and other animals, plants, and fungi.

== Mission ==
GSA serves an international community of scientists who use genetics to make new discoveries and improve lives. Its mission is to cultivate an inclusive, diverse research community that engages with the public, communicates the excitement and implications of discovery, and serves as an authoritative source of information. Its activities include:

- advancing biological research by supporting professional development of scientists
- communicating advances and fostering collaboration through scholarly publishing and conferences
- advocating for science and for scientists

== Programs ==
=== Investigation of inheritance and heredity ===
The GSA advocates funding of research in genetics, primarily through its membership in the Coalition for the Life Sciences (CLS), Federation of American Societies for Experimental Biology (FASEB), Research!America, and American Institute of Biological Sciences (AIBS). These organizations of leading scientists fosters public policies to advance basic biological research and its applications in medicine and other fields. The GSA also strives to inform state and national legislators about advances and issues in genetics.

=== Interaction among geneticists ===
The GSA organizes and sponsors several conferences for researchers (see below). These include the long-running model organism meetings: Yeast (biennial), C. elegans (biennial), Fungal (biennial) and Drosophila (annual). It has also established the Population, Evolutionary, and Quantitative Genetics Conference (PEQG, biennial) and its flagship meeting The Allied Genetics Conference (TAGC, every four years).

=== Communication of discoveries ===
The GSA publishes GENETICS, the leading journal for geneticists since the first issue in 1916, and G3: Genes|Genomes|Genetics, an open-access journal publishing high-quality fundamental research in genetics and genomics.

=== Education of students and the public ===
The GSA's Education Committee seeks to facilitate the integration of advances in genetics in the K through college curriculum. The GSA communicates to the public advances in genetics and answers to issues by providing expert opinion to the press and others.

== Publications ==
GSA publishes two peer-edited scientific journals:

- GENETICS. Established in 1916, GENETICS is a monthly scientific journal publishing investigations bearing on heredity, genetics, biochemistry, and molecular biology. The current editor-in-chief is Howard Lipshitz.
- G3: Genes|Genomes|Genetics. Established in 2011, G3 is an open access scientific journal which provides a forum for the publication of high‐quality foundational research, particularly research that generates useful genetic and genomic information such as genome maps, single gene studies, genome‐wide association studies, and QTL studies, as well as mutant screens and advances in methods and technology. The current editor-in-chief is Lauren M. McIntyre.

In 2013, the Society announced an editorial partnership with the American Society for Cell Biology to collaborate on the publication of journal CBE–Life Sciences Education.

== GSA conferences ==
GSA organizes a number of scientific meetings, including many focused on model organisms of use in genetic studies.

- C. elegans: The C. elegans Meeting is generally held in odd-number years.
- Chlamydomonas: The International Conference on the Cell and Molecular Biology of Chlamydomonas is generally held every four years in North America.
- Drosophila: The Annual Drosophila Research Conference is held annually.
- Fungi: The Fungal Genetics Conference is generally held in odd-numbered years.
- Mouse: GSA has organized both the Mouse Genetics Conference and the Mouse Molecular Genetics Conference.
- Xenopus: The International Xenopus Conference is generally held in even-numbered years.
- Yeast: The Yeast Genetics Meeting is generally held in even-numbered years.
- Zebrafish: The International Conference on Zebrafish Development and Genetics is generally held in even-numbered years. The Strategic Conference of Zebrafish Investigators is generally held in odd-numbered years.

In 2016, the Society co-located several of these meetings for The Allied Genetics Conference (TAGC). Intended to be held every four years, the 2020 TAGC conference was held virtually due to the COVID-19 pandemic.

== GSA awards ==
The Genetics Society of America recognizes outstanding geneticists with following awards:

- The Thomas Hunt Morgan Medal for lifetime contributions to the field of genetics
- The Genetics Society of America Medal for outstanding contributions to the field of genetics in the last 15 years
- The George W. Beadle Award for outstanding contributions to the community of genetics researchers
- The Elizabeth W. Jones Award for Excellence in Education in recognition of significant and sustained impact on genetics education
- The Edward Novitski Prize in recognition of extraordinary creativity and ingenuity in solving problems in genetics.
- The Elizabeth W. Jones Award for Excellence in Education
- The DeLill Nasser Awards for Professional Development in Genetics for young geneticists to attend national and international meetings and enroll in laboratory courses.
- The James F. Crow Early Career Researcher Award
- The Genetics Society of America Early Career Medal
- The Rosalind Franklin Young Investigator Award

== Selected past presidents ==
Source: GSA

- 2023: Tracy Johnson
- 2022: E.J. Hubbard
- 2021: Hugo J. Bellen
- 2020: Denise J. Montell
- 2019: Terry R. Magnuson
- 2018: Jeannie T. Lee
- 2017: Lynn Cooley
- 2016: Stanley Fields
- 2015: Jasper Donald Rine
- 2014: V. Chandler
- 2013: Michael Lynch
- 2012: Philip Hieter
- 2011: Paul W. Sternberg
- 2010: R.S. Hawley
- 2009: Fred Marshall Winston
- 2008: Gertrud Schüpbach
- 2007: Allan C. Spradling
- 2006: Barry S. Ganetzky
- 2005: Terry Orr-Weaver
- 2004: Mark Johnston
- 2003: Cynthia Kenyon
- 2002: Thomas D. Petes
- 2001: Marian Carlson
- 2000: Judith E. Kimble
- 1999: Elliot M. Meyerowitz
- 1998: T.C. Kaufman
- 1997: David Botstein
- 1996: R.E. Esposito
- 1995: H. Robert Horvitz
- 1994: Bruce S. Baker
- 1993: A. Dale Kaiser
- 1992: J.C. Lucchesi
- 1991: Leland H. Hartwell
- 1990: Robert Metzenberg
- 1989: Daniel Hartl
- 1988: Gerald Fink
- 1987: E.W. Jones
- 1986: Dan Lindsley
- 1985: Ira Herskowitz
- 1984: Robert W. Allard
- 1983: Mary-Lou Pardue
- 1982: H.L. Car
- 1981: B.H. Judd
- 1980: W.K. Baker
- 1979: Ernest R. Sears
- 1978: M. Shaw
- 1977: D.D. Perkins
- 1976: Elizabeth S. Russell
- 1975: Oliver Smithies
- 1974: Bruce Wallace
- 1973: M.M. Green
- 1972: Rollin Hotchkiss
- 1971: Robert P. Wagner
- 1970: Norman H. Giles
- 1969: Charles Yanofsky
- 1968: Herschel L. Roman
- 1967: Edward B. Lewis
- 1966: Ernst Caspari
- 1965: William L. Russell
- 1964: Sterling Emerson
- 1963: Jack Schulz
- 1962: Ray D. Owen
- 1961: Berwind P. Kaufmann
- 1960: James F. Crow
- 1959: Karl Sax
- 1958: Clarence Paul Oliver
- 1957: Royal Alexander Brink
- 1956: Ralph Erskine Cleland
- 1955: Paul Christoph Mangelsdorf
- 1954: John Thomas Patterson
- 1953: Roy Elwood Clausen
- 1952: John Whittemore Gowen
- 1951: Malcolm Robert Irwin
- 1950: Curt Stern
- 1949: Tracy Sonneborn
- 1948: Laurence H. Snyder
- 1947: Hermann Joseph Muller
- 1946: George Beadle
- 1945: Barbara McClintock
- 1944: Alfred Sturtevant
- 1943: Marcus Morton Rhoades
- 1942: Ernest W. Lindstrom
- 1941: Theodosius Dobzhansky
- 1940: Leon Jacob Cole
- 1939: Milislav Demerec
- 1938: Lewis Stadler
- 1937: Edward Murray East
- 1936: P.W. Whiting
- 1935: Donald F. Jones
- 1934: Sewall Wright
- 1933: Rollins A. Emerson
- 1932: L.C. Dunn (1st president)
