= Amy Pedersen =

American disease ecologist and academic

Amy Beth Pedersen FRSE

Academic background
- Education: University of Virginia (PhD); George Washington University (BS)
- Thesis: Intestinal parasites, acorn masts and population dynamics of Peromyscus (2005)
- Doctoral advisor: Janis Antonovics

Academic work
- Discipline: Ecologist
- Sub-discipline: Disease ecology
- Institutions: University of Edinburgh; University of Sheffield; University of Georgia

Amy Beth Pedersen is an American disease ecologist, and academic. She is currently the personal chair of disease ecology at the University of Edinburgh, and she was awarded a Fellowship of the Royal Society of Edinburgh in 2026.

== Education ==
In 1995, Pedersen attended George Washington University and studied biology and ecology. In 1999, she graduated with a Bachelor of Science. In 2000, she attended the University of Virginia. Under the supervision of Janis Antonovics, her thesis was titled Intestinal parasites, acorn masts and population dynamics of Peromyscus, and she was awarded a Doctor of Philosophy in 2005.

== Career ==
From 2005 to 2006, Pedersen was a postdoctoral research associate at the Institute of Ecology, University of Georgia. Under the supervision of Sonia Altizer, Pedersen researched on transmission of parasites among wild primates.

In November 2006, Pedersen was awarded an international research fellowship by the Royal Society, and she joined the University of Sheffield. In June 2009, Pedersen was appointed a senior research fellow at the Centre for Infection, Immunity and Evolution, University of Edinburgh.

In August 2022, Pedersen was appointed the personal chair of disease ecology. In 2026, Pedersen was elected a Fellow of the Royal Society of Edinburgh, in the discipline of organismal and environmental biology.

Pedersen is currently the principal investigator of the Pedersen Group, a research group of the School of Biological Sciences.

== Research ==
Pedersen's research is about disease ecology and evolution, and focuses on the impact of parasites on the health of different species. In June 2013, Pedersen led a study on treating parasites in wild mammal, specifically wild wood mice. Funded by the Natural Environment Research Council and the Wellcome Trust, the study showed that treating infections resulted in co-existing conditions worsening. Pedersen said that infections rarely occur in nature, and the study showed "for the first time that treating infections in isolation can have knock-on effects for other diseases that may be present".

To date, Pedersen has authored or co-authored more than 50 publications.

== Selected publications ==
- Altizer, Sonia; Nunn, Charles L.; Thrall, Peter H.; Gittleman, John L.; Antonovics, Janis; Cunningham, Andrew A.; Dobson, Andrew P.; Ezenwa, Vanessa; Jones, Kate E.; Pedersen, Amy B.; Poss, Mary; Pulliam, Juliet R.C. (November 2003). "Social Organization and Parasite Risk in Mammals: Integrating Theory and Empirical Studies". Annual Review of Ecology, Evolution, and Systematics. 34 (1): 517–547. doi:10.1146/annurev.ecolsys.34.030102.151725. ISSN 1543-592X. JSTOR 30033785. LCCN 2003213237. OCLC 51651460. CODEN ARECBC.
- Pedersen, Amy B.; Fenton, Andy (March 2007). "Emphasizing the ecology in parasite community ecology". Trends in Ecology & Evolution. 22 (3): 133–139. doi:10.1016/j.tree.2006.11.005. eISSN 1872-8383. ISSN 0169-5347. PMID 17137676.
- Pedersen, Amy B.; Jones, Kate E.; Nunn, Charles L.; Altizer, Sonia (19 September 2007). "Infectious Diseases and Extinction Risk in Wild Mammals". Conservation Biology. 21 (5): 1269–1279. doi:10.1111/j.1523-1739.2007.00776.x. eISSN 1523-1739. ISSN 0888-8892. LCCN 88659972. OCLC 715539913. PMC 7202242. PMID 17883492. CODEN CBIOEF.
- Pedersen, Amy B.; Greives, Timothy J. (19 November 2007). "The interaction of parasites and resources cause crashes in a wild mouse population". Journal of Animal Ecology. 77 (2): 370–377. doi:10.1111/j.1365-2656.2007.01321.x. eISSN 1365-2656. ISSN 0021-8790. LCCN agr35000273. OCLC 42799265. PMID 18028357. CODEN JAECAP.
- Smith, K. F.; Acevedo‐Whitehouse, K.; Pedersen, A. B. (28 January 2009). "The role of infectious diseases in biological conservation". Animal Conservation. 12 (1): 1–12. doi:10.1111/j.1469-1795.2008.00228.x. ISSN 1367-9430.
- Pedersen, Amy B.; Babayan, Simon A. (3 January 2011). "Wild immunology". Molecular Ecology. 20 (5): 872–880. doi:10.1111/j.1365-294X.2010.04938.x. eISSN 1365-294X. ISSN 0962-1083. OCLC 39265322. PMID 21324009. CODEN MOECEO.
