= Sewall Wright Award =

Award given annually by the American Society of Naturalists

- Sponsored by: American Society of Naturalists
- Reward: $1,000
- Website: www.amnat.org/awards.html

ASN Award for Distinguished Achievement in the Conceptual Unification of the Biological Sciences, previously known as the Sewall Wright Award, is given annually by the American Society of Naturalists to a "senior-level" and active investigator making fundamental contributions the conceptual unification of the biological sciences. The award was established in 1991 and named after Sewall Wright. The recipient need not be a member of the Society or an American. A plaque and award of $1,000 are presented at a banquet.

== Award recipients ==
Source: American Society of Naturalists

- 1992 Russell Lande
- 1993 Joseph Felsenstein
- 1994 Richard C. Lewontin
- 1995 John Maynard Smith
- 1996 Robert T. Paine
- 1997 Douglas J. Futuyma
- 1998 William D. Hamilton
- 1999 Janis Antonovics
- 2000 Montgomery Slatkin
- 2001 Illkka A. Hanski
- 2002 Linda Partridge
- 2003 Mary Jane West-Eberhard
- 2004 Rudolf Raff
- 2005 Robert E. Ricklefs
- 2006 Brian Charlesworth
- 2007 Dolph Schluter
- 2008 Spencer Barrett
- 2009 Michael J. Wade
- 2010 William R. Rice
- 2011 Robert D. Holt
- 2012 Richard E. Lenski
- 2013 Jeanne Altmann
- 2014 Mark Kirkpatrick
- 2015 Sarah Otto
- 2016 Mark D. Rausher
- 2017 Ruth Geyer Shaw
- 2018 John McNamara
- 2019 Jonathan B. Losos
- 2020 Sharon Y. Strauss
- 2021 Susan Alberts
- 2022 Laurent Keller
- 2023 Judith L. Bronstein
- 2024 Anurag Agrawal
- 2025 Stuart West
- 2026 Steven A. Frank

== See also ==
- List of biology awards
