= Ezenwa =

Ezenwa is a surname. Notable people with the surname include:

- Ezenwa Otorogu, Nigerian footballer
- Ezenwa Ukeagu, Nigerian basketball player
- Chi Ezenwa, author
- Ikechukwu Ezenwa, Nigerian footballer
- Onyewuchi Francis Ezenwa (born 1968), Nigerian politician
- Vanessa Ezenwa, American ecologist
