= Michael J. Wade =

American academic biologist

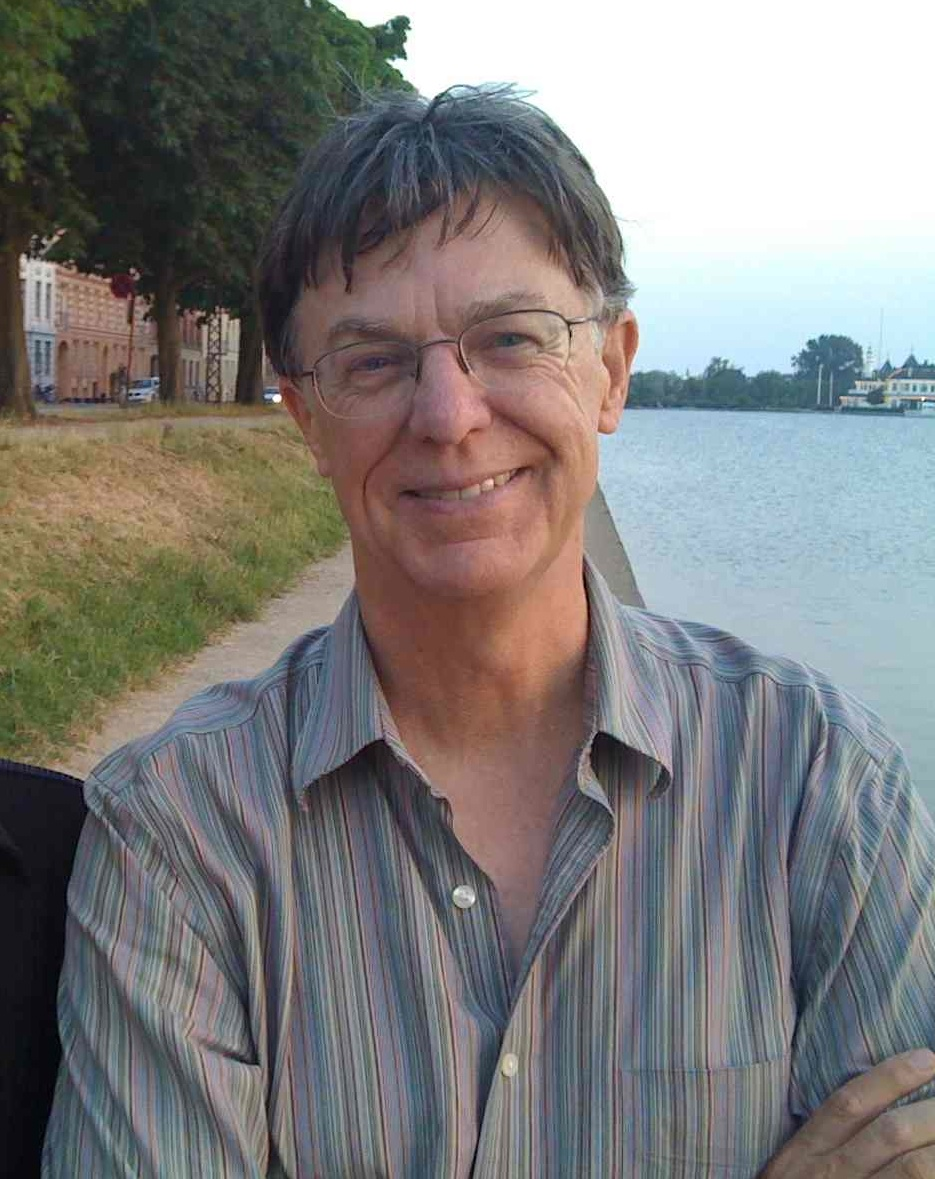
Michael J. Wade, by the Copenhagen lakes, summer 2010

Michael J. Wade is a professor of biology at Indiana University Bloomington. Since 2009 he has been the Associate Vice Provost for Faculty and Academic Affairs at Indiana University. He is also affiliated faculty in the following departments and centers at Indiana University: Center for the Integrative Study of Animal Behavior (CISAB), the Cognitive Science Program , and the Department of History and Philosophy of Science.

== Academic career ==
Wade was a professor at University of Chicago from 1975 to 1998 (Assistant Professor, Department of Biology, 1975-1981; Associate Professor, Department of Biology, 1981-1986; Professor, Department of Ecology and Evolution , 1986-1998; Chair, Department of Ecology and Evolution, 1991-1998). He received his PhD from University of Chicago in 1975, under the joint tutelage of the ecologist Thomas Park and the theoretical population geneticist, Montgomery Slatkin (now at University of California, Berkeley). His doctoral committee included the cicada ecologist, Monty Lloyd, the laboratory ecologist, David Byron Mertz, and the anuran systematist, Robert Inger. Park arranged for him to meet and discuss his doctoral research with Sewall Wright on several occasions. His dissertation, and subsequent research program, focused on the evolution, ecology, and genetics of flour beetles of the genus Tribolium. At the earliest stages of his graduate career, he had been interested in the ecology of frogs in vernal ponds in Chicago.

He received the Quantrell Award.

== Research ==
Two central interests of Wade's research program are population structure and epistasis. Interactions at the population and genetic levels are often non-additive. Thus, explaining and predicting many genetic and evolutionary phenomena in nature require understanding non-additive causal effects. As Richard Lewontin wrote, "context and interaction are of the essence". In effect, Wade has found extensive empirical support, in the laboratory and in the field, for Sewall Wright's Shifting balance theory. Through significant mathematical modeling, Wade has also shown that Wright's theory is robust and explanatorily powerful. Wade's results, in concert with work by David Sloan Wilson, helped rekindle interest in group selection in the biological community.

Wade has also done influential work on sexual selection (see papers with Stevan Arnold, and book with Stephen Shuster, cited below), and the genetics of speciation, stressing the need to consider variation within species as well as fixed differences among species. Recently, his work has turned to social evolution and indirect genetic effects (e.g., maternal effects). Wade and his collaborators are increasingly employing rich genomics data and turning to other model systems, such as social insects.

In addition to biological topics, Wade is also interested in the history and philosophy of science, politics, and literature. He has published on topics central to the philosophy of science, such as levels and units of selection and causality.

== Distinctions ==
Wade has published over 150 scientific papers and book chapters, and received several distinctions, including membership in the American Association for the Advancement of Science in 2007, in the American Academy of Arts and Sciences in 2008, and he was recognized with the Sewall Wright Award in 2009.

== Key publications ==
- Wade MJ. 1978. "A Critical Review of the Models of Group Selection." Quarterly Review of Biology 53: 101-114.
- Wade MJ. 1980. "Kin Selection: Its Components." Science 210: 665-67.
- Arnold SJ, Wade MJ. 1984. "On the Measurement of Natural and Sexual Selection: Theory." Evolution 38: 709-719.
- Arnold SJ, Wade MJ. 1984. "On the Measurement of Natural and Sexual Selection: Applications." Evolution 38: 720-734.
- Wade MJ. 1985. "Soft Selection, Hard Selection, Kin Selection, and Group Selection." American Naturalist 125: 61-73.
- Wade MJ, and Goodnight CJ. 1998. "Genetics and adaptation in metapopulations: When nature does many small experiments." Evolution 52:1537-1553.
- Wolf JB, Brodie III ED, and Wade MJ. 2000. Epistasis and the Evolutionary Process. Oxford University Press.
- Shuster SM, Wade MJ. 2003. Mating Systems and Strategies. Princeton University Press.
