= Jeanne Altmann =

American primatologist

Jeanne Altmann, born March 18, 1940, in New York City, is a Eugene Higgins Professor Emeritus of animal behavior and physiology at Princeton University. She is known for her research on the social behaviour of baboons, contributions to contemporary primate behavioural ecology, and for "revolutionizing" field-sampling methodology. Her paper in 1974 on the observational study of behaviour is a cornerstone for ecologists and has been cited over 20,000 times. She was also one of the first researchers to study primate mothers and the effects of genes on parenting and mating. She is a founder and director emerita of the Amboseli Baboon Research Project, a former Fellow of the National Academy of Sciences, and a member of the American Philosophical Society (2020).

== Early life and education ==
Jeanne Altmann started her undergraduate degree at UCLA as a mathematics major. During her second year, she transferred to MIT after marrying Stuart Altmann, who was a graduate student at Harvard. She accompanied him to the University of Alberta, where she received her degree in mathematics in 1962. Altmann then attended Emory University for her M.A.T. in mathematics and teaching, which she earned in 1970. Later, she started her graduate degree in biology at the University of Chicago. She focused on social and familial interactions of baboons for her dissertation.

Using her mathematics background, she was employed as a data analyst in a lab studying human childhood. She drew upon her mathematics skills to write her best known paper, a survey of field research sampling methodologies, in 1974. It has been cited over 20,000 times, as of October 2025.

== Career and research ==
After graduating from the University of Alberta, Altmann began work as a primate researcher at the university; she stayed in this position until 1965. While at Emory, she researched at the Yerkes National Primate Research Center, then moved to the University of Chicago for her doctoral studies and the bulk of her career. She became an associate professor there in 1985 and was promoted to full professor in 1989. She also curated the primate exhibits at the Brookfield Zoo in the Chicago suburbs. In 1998, Altmann moved to Princeton University, where she remains a professor emerita. From 2003 to 2008, she was a visiting professor of animal physiology at the University of Nairobi, and has been an honorary zoology lecturer there since 1989.

Altmann is known for her involvement with the creation and development of the Amboseli Baboon Research Project, which counts its official start in 1971, following a preliminary field study in 1963–4. In 1981, Altmann worked to "Africanize" the Amboseli Baboon Project by hiring local people in positions of authority. Instead of relying on a rotating group of Western researchers (the common practice at the time), Altmann hired a member of the local Maasai community and other Kenyans to make observations, manage lab samples, and educate assistants year-round. According to historian Georgia M. Montgomery, Altmann's directorship of the Baboon Project and her extensive publication record have "led to her status as a leader in animal behavior studies."

This was not the extent of Altmann's influence. In a 1974 article for Behaviour, "Observational Study of Behavior: Sampling Methods," Altmann reviewed the current standardized data collection methods. Ad lib sampling, for example, was perhaps the most common method; it referred to a loose process where the field researcher simply makes notes of what s/he sees. This type of "unconscious" decision-making, however, could lead to biased results. (Early baboon researchers noticed only a select group of the more active or aggressive animals and drew conclusions about a whole group based on that minority.) Focal sampling, by contrast, was a method in which scientists observed individual animals for a set period of time and noted their actions, even if the actions seemed insignificant. (Robert Sapolosky discussed using this sampling method in his popular memoir about life baboon life.)

Before Altmann's 1974 survey, most field researchers did not pay much attention to how the method used to observe animals impacted the kinds of data collected. This made it difficult to compare animal behavior in different studies and draw reliable conclusions. But Altmann's paper initiated a revolution in field studies, helping protect against individual bias and making comparative studies easier.

Altmann was one of the first researchers to study primate mothers and the effects of genes on parenting and mating. In 1980, her monograph Baboons Mothers and Infants, documented variation in reproductive success among wild female baboons. According to the International Encyclopedia of Primatology, her findings "profoundly changed the prevailing view of females more generally, and of mammalian females more specifically." This research was considered foundational, leading to greater understanding of how a mother's world affected her offspring's phenotypes in a nongenetic manner.

Altmann was awarded the Sewall Wright Award in 2013 and the Lifetime Achievement Award from the International Primatological Society in 2014. Her fieldwork employs observational rather than experimental sampling methods. This allows her to follow the behaviour of baboons in their natural environment. She utilizes mainly non-invasive techniques. The ABRP also collects fecal samples for genetic, hormonal, and intestinal bacterial analyses.

With collaborators Susan Alberts, Elizabeth Archie, and Jenny Tung, Altmann's research interests have included demography, the mother-infant relationship, behavioral ecology and endocrinology, the evolution of social behavior, aging, sexual selection, disease ecology, and functional genomics.

== Honors and awards ==
- 1988 - Fellow, American Association of Zoological Parks and Aquariums
- 1989 - Fellow, Animal Behavior Society
- 1996 - Exemplar Award, Animal Behavior Society
- 1996 - Fellow, American Academy of Arts and Sciences
- 2003 - Fellow, National Academy of Sciences
- 2012 - Distinguished Animal Behaviorist Award, Animal Behavior Society
- 2013 - Sewall Wright Award
- 2014 - Lifetime Achievement Award, International Primatological Society
- 2020 - Member, American Philosophical Society
- 2022 - BBVA Foundation Frontiers of Knowledge Award

== Bibliography ==
- Altmann, Stuart A.; Altmann, Jeanne (1970) Baboon Ecology: African Field Research, University of Chicago Press.
- Altmann, Jeanne (1974). "Observational Study of Behavior: Sampling Methods". Behaviour. 49 (3, 4): 227–267. doi:10.1163/156853974X00534. JSTOR 4533591. PMID 4597405.
- Altmann, Jeanne; Altmann, Stuart A.; Hausfater, Glenn; McCuskey, Sue Ann (1977). "Life history of yellow baboons: physical development, reproductive parameters, and infant mortality". Primates. 18 (2): 315–330. doi:10.1007/bf02383111. S2CID 18566811.
- Altmann, Jeanne. (1980). Baboon Mothers and Infants. Cambridge: Harvard University Press.
- Alberts, Susan C.; Altmann, Jeanne (1995). "Balancing costs and opportunities: dispersal in male baboons". American Naturalist. 145 (2): 279–306. doi:10.1086/285740. S2CID 84603061.
- Altmann, Jeanne; Alberts, Susan C.; Haines, Susan A.; Dubach, Jean; Muruthi, Philip; Coote, Trevor; Geffern, Eli; et al. (1996). "Behaviour predicts genes structure in a wild primate group". Proceedings of the National Academy of Sciences. 93 (12): 5797–5801. doi:10.1073/pnas.93.12.5797. PMC 39141. PMID 8650172.
- Altmann, Jeanne (2001-08-15). Baboon Mothers and Infants. University of Chicago Press. ISBN 9780226016078.
- Silk, Joan B.; Alberts, Susan C.; Altmann, Jeanne (2003). "Social bonds of female baboons enhance infant survival". Science. 302 (5648): 1231–1234. Bibcode:2003Sci...302.1231S. doi:10.1126/science.1088580. PMID 14615543. S2CID 24970809.
- Altmann, Jeanne. 2009. “Motherhood, Methods, and Monkeys: An Intertwined Professional and Personal Life.” In Leaders in Animal Behavior, edited by Lee Drickamer and Donald Dewsbury, 39–58. Cambridge: Cambridge University Press.
