= Douglas J. Futuyma =

American evolutionary biologist (born 1942)

Douglas Joel Futuyma
- Born: April 24, 1942 (age 84); New York City, U.S.
- Education: Cornell University, University of Michigan
- Awards: Sewall Wright Award (1997); Leidy Award (2012)
- Scientific career
- Fields: Biology
- Workplaces: University of Michigan; State University of New York at Stony Brook

Douglas Joel Futuyma (born 24 April 1942) is an American evolutionary biologist. He is a Distinguished Professor in the Department of Ecology and Evolution at Stony Brook University in Stony Brook, New York and a Research Associate on staff at the American Museum of Natural History in New York City. His research focuses on speciation and population biology. Futuyma is the author of a widely used undergraduate textbook on evolution and is also known for his work in public outreach, particularly in advocating against creationism.

== Education ==
Futuyma graduated with a B.S. from Cornell University. He received his M.S. in 1966 and his Ph.D. in zoology in 1969, both from the University of Michigan, Ann Arbor.

== Academic career ==
Futuyma began his career in the Department of Ecology and Evolution at Stony Brook University in 1969 and was appointed Distinguished Professor in 2001. He served as the chair of the Department of Ecology and Evolutionary Biology at University of Michigan, Ann Arbor from 2002-2003 and as the Lawrence B. Slobodkin Collegiate Professor in that department from 2003-2004 before returning to Stony Brook in 2004.

Futuyma served as the president of the Society for the Study of Evolution in 1987, of the American Society of Naturalists in 1994, and of the American Institute of Biological Sciences in 2008. He has served as the editor of the scientific journals Evolution and the Annual Review of Ecology, Evolution, and Systematics (2002-2026).

== Research ==
Futuyma's research examines speciation and population biology, particularly the evolutionary interactions between herbivorous insects and their plant hosts and the implications for evolution of host specificity.

== Teaching and outreach ==
Futuyma is well known for his success in teaching and public outreach. He is the author of several textbooks, most notably the very widely used authoritative text Evolutionary Biology (in its third edition, published 1998) and a simplified version targeted explicitly to undergraduates, Evolution (in its fourth edition, published 2017). The latter text has been positively reviewed as important to the successful teaching of evolution, though less comprehensive than the former. He has also co-edited a more advanced book composed of edited reviews, Coevolution, with Montgomery Slatkin; it received mixed reviews from those in the field.

Futuyma has also written for a popular audience in his book Science on Trial: The Case for Evolution, originally published in 1982, in which he discusses the creation–evolution controversy. The book has been regarded as highly effective in making the argument for evolution and as a tool for discussing the topic with those who are uncertain; philosopher of biology Michael Ruse described it as "a first-class book". It was also reviewed as suitable for use in undergraduate education. Richard Lewontin found the book "lucid" but criticized its presentation, along with other books on the topic published around the same time, as failing to capture the origins of the debate as a social phenomenon.

Since 2013, Futuyma has been listed on the Advisory Council of the National Center for Science Education.

Futuyma is openly gay. He has said that he was initially surprised at the lack of negative career consequences, and that LGBT visibility is important to progress on gay rights. In 1984 he co-authored a scientific paper critical of the evidence available at the time that homosexuality might be genetic. In later editions of his textbook Evolution, Futuyma noted that subsequent research has provided stronger evidence for genetic contributions to sexual orientation, reflecting developments in the field since the publication of the earlier paper.

== Awards and honors ==
Futuyma was named a fellow of the American Association for the Advancement of Science in 1985 and of the American Academy of Arts and Sciences in 1996. He was elected to the United States National Academy of Sciences in 2006.

Futuyma was selected as a Guggenheim Fellow in 1992 and as a Fulbright Fellow senior scholar in 1999, awarded for travel to the University of Melbourne in Australia.

He received the Sewall Wright Award from the American Society of Naturalists in 1997 and the Leidy Award from the Academy of Natural Sciences of Drexel University in 2012.
