= Mark Kirkpatrick =

American geneticist

- Born: Mark A. Kirkpatrick
- Education: University of Washington
- Scientific career
- Fields: Population genetics
- Workplaces: University of Texas at Austin
- Doctoral advisor: Montgomery Slatkin
- Other academic advisors: Joe Felsenstein
- Website: https://kirkpatricklab.org/

Mark A. Kirkpatrick is a theoretical population geneticist and evolutionary biologist. He currently holds the T. S. Painter Centennial Professorship in Genetics in the Department of Integrative Biology at the University of Texas at Austin. His research spans a wide range of topics, including the evolution of sex chromosomes, sexual selection, and speciation. Kirkpatrick is the co-author, along with Douglas J. Futuyma, of a popular undergraduate evolution textbook. He is a member of the United States National Academy of Sciences.

== Education ==
Kirkpatrick earned an undergraduate degree in biology from Harvard University in 1978 and a Ph.D. from the University of Washington in 1983. His doctoral advisor was Montgomery Slatkin.

== Research ==
Kirkpatrick’s research focuses on fundamental questions in theoretical evolutionary genetics. He has studied the evolution of female mating preferences from a population genetic perspective and, in addition to Russell Lande, formally modeled Ronald Fisher’s concept of runaway arbitrary intersexual selection and its role in speciation. Kirkpatrick has worked on questions in quantitative genetics, speciation, and chromosome evolution, with a focus on the evolution of rearrangements, including inversions and fusions. He has also been actively involved in research on sex chromosome evolution and sex determination.

== Notable awards ==
Awards received include:

- Guggenheim Fellowship (1997)
- Poste Rouge Fellow, National Center for Scientific Research, France (1997)
- American Society of Naturalists President’s Award (1998)
- College of Natural Sciences Award for Excellence in Teaching (2002)
- Fellow of the American Academy of Arts and Sciences (2008)
- Miller Visiting Professor, University of California at Berkeley (2009)
- Elected member of the National Academy of Sciences (2020)

== Representative works ==
- Kirkpatrick, M. (1982). "Sexual selection and the evolution of female choice". Evolution. 36 (1): 1–12. doi:10.1111/j.1558-5646.1982.tb05003.x. PMID 28581098.
- Kirkpatrick, M.; Lande, R. (1989). "The Evolution of Maternal Characters". Evolution. 43 (3): 485–503. doi:10.1111/j.1558-5646.1989.tb04247.x. PMID 28568400. S2CID 205777046.
- Kirkpatrick, M.; Lofsvold, D.; Bulmer, M. (1990). "Analysis of the inheritance, selection and evolution of growth trajectories". Genetics. 124 (4): 979–993. doi:10.1093/genetics/124.4.979. PMC 1203988. PMID 2323560.
- Kirkpatrick, M.; Ryan, M. J. (1991). "The evolution of mating preferences and the paradox of the lek". Nature. 350 (6313): 33–38. Bibcode:1991Natur.350...33K. doi:10.1038/350033a0. S2CID 4366707.
- Kirkpatrick, M.; Barton, N. H. (1997). "Evolution of a species' range". The American Naturalist. 150 (1): 1–23. doi:10.1086/286054. PMID 18811273. S2CID 28389132.
- Kirkpatrick, M.; Ravigné, V. (1997). "Speciation by natural and sexual selection: models and experiments". The American Naturalist. 159 (S3): S22–S35. doi:10.1086/338370. PMID 18707367. S2CID 16516804.
- Kirkpatrick, M.; Barton, N. H. (2006). "Chromosome inversions, local adaptation and speciation". Genetics. 173 (1): 419–434. doi:10.1534/genetics.105.047985. PMC 1461441. PMID 16204214.

== Bibliography ==
- Evolution, Douglas J. Futuyma & Mark Kirkpatrick, 2017, 594 pages, Sunderland, Massachusetts: Sinauer Associates; 4th edition, ISBN 9781605356051
