= John Stinchcombe =

Evolutionary biologist

John R. Stinchcombe
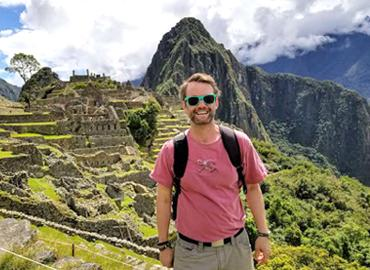
- Born: 1974 (age 51–52); Syracuse, NY, USA
- Citizenship: USA & Canada
- Education: Duke University (PhD, 2001); Bucknell University, (BA, 1996)
- Scientific career
- Fields: Ecological Genetics; Evolutionary Biology
- Workplaces: University of Toronto Koffler Scientific Reserve Brown University
- Thesis: Evolutionary ecology of deer resistance and tolerance in the Ivyleaf morning glory, Ipomoea hederacea. (2001)
- Doctoral advisor: Mark D. Rausher
- Other academic advisors: Warren G. Abrahamson; Douglas K. Candland
- Website: https://stinchcombe.eeb.utoronto.ca/

John R. Stinchcombe (born 1974) is an American and Canadian ecological geneticist who is a professor of ecology and evolutionary biology at the University of Toronto. His research is on the ecology of natural selection, and the role of genetics in facilitating or constraining evolution, focusing almost exclusively on plants.

== Early life and education ==
Stinchcombe grew up in Syracuse, NY, USA, in an outdoors-loving family. He was an undergraduate at Bucknell University, graduating in 1996. He then spent a summer working for the National Marine Fisheries Service, in Washington, D.C., before starting his Ph.D. at Duke University in 1996. He started in the Zoology Department, and finished his PhD in 2001 in the Biology Department, with a Certificate in Ecology. His PhD research was on the evolution of resistance and tolerance to herbivory in the Ivyleaf morning glory (Ipomoea hederacea). Stinchcombe's post-doctoral work was at Brown University, working with Johanna Schmitt. His work there was on flowering time clines and genetics in mouse ear cress (Arabidopsis thaliana), as well as growth plasticity in touch-me-nots (Impatiens capensis).

== Research and career ==
Stinchcombe started a faculty position at the University of Toronto in 2005, in the Botany Department, and joined the Department of Ecology and Evolutionary Biology at its creation.

Stinchcombe's research is on plant ecological genetics. Topics investigated by his lab include the genetics of flowering time, clines, phenotypic plasticity, plant-microbe interactions, natural selection in the field, evolution of gene expression, and the evolution of herbicide resistance.

Stinchcombe served as the Secretary for the Society for the Study of Evolution, and since 2013 he has been the Director of the Koffler Scientific Reserve, the University of Toronto's field research station.

== Recent publications ==
From Google Scholar Profile

- Harrison, T. L., Z. A. Parshuram, M. E. Frederickson, and J. R. Stinchcombe. 2024. Is there a latitudinal diversity gradient for symbiotic microbes? A case study with sensitive partridge peas. Molecular Ecology 33: e17191; doi: https://doi.org/10.1111/mec.17191
- Henry, G. A., and J. R. Stinchcombe. 2023. G-matrix stability in clinally diverging populations of an annual weed. Evolution 77:49–62.
- Kreiner, J. M., S. M. Latorre, H. A. Burbano, J. R. Stinchcombe, S. P. Otto, D. Weigel, and S. I. Wright. 2022. Rapid weed adaptation and range expansion in response to agriculture over the past two centuries. Science 378:1079–1085.
- Kreiner, J. M., A. Caballero, S. I. Wright, and J. R. Stinchcombe. 2022. Selective ancestral sorting and de novo evolution in the agricultural invasion of Amaranthus tuberculatus. Evolution 76:70–85.
- Gomulkiewicz, R., and J. R. Stinchcombe. 2022. Phenotypic plasticity made simple, but not too simple. Am. J. Bot. 109:1519–1524.
- McGoey, B. V., and J. R. Stinchcombe. 2021. Introduced populations of ragweed show as much evolutionary potential as native populations. Evol. Appl. 14:1436–1449.

== Honors ==
- 1995 Harry S. Truman Scholarship
- 2019 Distinguished Professor of Ecological Genetics, University of Toronto
- 2023 Natural Sciences Fellow, Swedish Collegium for Advanced Study
