= Susan Alberts =

American primatologist, anthropologist

- Education: Reed College; UCLA; University of Chicago
- Scientific career
- Fields: Primatology
- Institutions: Duke University; Amboseli Baboon Research Project

Susan C. Alberts is an American primatologist, anthropologist, and biologist who is the current Chair of the Department of Evolutionary Anthropology at Duke University; previously, she served as a Bass fellow and the Robert F. Durden Professor of Biology at Duke. She currently co-directs the Amboseli Baboon Research Project with Jeanne Altmann of Princeton University. Her research broadly studies how animal behavior evolved in mammals, with a specific focus on the social behavior, demography, and genetics of the yellow baboon, although some of her work has included the African elephant. She was elected a fellow of the American Academy of Arts and Sciences in 2014, won the Cozzarelli Prize of the National Academy of Sciences in 2016, and was elected a fellow of the National Academy of Sciences in 2019.

== Education ==
Alberts received a Bachelor of Arts degree in Biology from Reed College in 1983, and went on to earn a Master of Arts in Biology from University of California, Los Angeles in 1987. She earned her Ph.D. in Ecology and Evolution at University of Chicago in 1992 for her work with her advisor, Jeanne Altmann. Her dissertation examined the maturation and dispersal of male baboons. She pursued postdoctoral research at the University of Chicago as an NIH Fellow, and was a Junior Fellow at Harvard University, and a Bunting Fellow at Radcliffe. She has been on the faculty at Duke since 1998.

== Research ==
Alberts' research focuses on the interplay between environment, genetics, and behavior. She has published over 100 peer-reviewed articles in the fields of anthropology, genetics, endocrinology, biology, and primatology. Early in her career, her research focused largely on the behavior of male baboons through dispersal, mate guarding, social rank within the group, while later in her research career, she expanded her inquiry to include life history, epigenetics, endocrinology, and mating systems of both sexes. Notably, her work has found links between longevity and social relationships within baboon groups, with cohesive group-living having benefits for surviving environmental stresses. Her most recent work focuses on the social dimensions of aging and how early-life adversity affects behavior, body size and immune function

Alberts has also served as an editor for numerous peer-reviewed journals in a variety of fields, including Behavioral Ecology (journal), the American Journal of Primatology, and PeerJ. In addition, she serves as a referee for a variety of journals and grant-funding organizations, including the Society for the Study of Evolution, the American Academy of Arts and Sciences, PNAS, Behaviour, and the National Science Foundation.

== Awards ==
Awards include:

- 2022 - BBVA Foundation Frontiers of Knowledge Award
- 2021 - Sewall Wright Award
- 2016 - Cozzarelli Prize. National Academy of Sciences, USA.
- 2012 - Dean's Award for Excellence in Mentoring. Duke University.
- 2010 - Thomas Langford Lectureship, Duke University. Duke University.
- 2009 - Distinguished Teaching and Service Award. Department of Biology, Duke University.
- 2001 - Faculty Early Career Development (CAREER) Program. National Science Foundation.

== Elected fellowships ==
Fellowships:

- 2019 - National Academy of Sciences member
- 2014 - American Academy of Arts and Sciences
- 2012 - American Association for the Advancement of Science
- 2012 - Dean’s Award for Excellence in Mentoring, Duke University
- 2010 - Thomas Langford Lectureship, Duke University
- 2009 - Distinguished Teaching and Service Award. Department of Biology, Duke University
- 2008 - Animal Behavior Society
- 2007 - Bass Society of Fellows, Duke University
- 2006-2007 - Faculty Fellowship, Social Sciences Research Institute, Duke University
- 1994-1997 - Junior Fellowship, Harvard Society of Fellows
- 1993-1994 - NIH National Research Service Award Post-doctoral Fellowship, University of Chicago
- 1983-1985 - Thomas J. Watson Foundation Fellowship for Research and Travel Abroad

== Bibliography ==
- Alberts, Susan C.; Altmann, Jeanne (1995). "Balancing costs and opportunities: dispersal in male baboons". American Naturalist. 145 (2): 279–306. doi:10.1086/285740. S2CID 84603061.
- Altmann, Jeanne; Alberts, Susan C.; Haines, Susan A.; Dubach, Jean; Muruthi, Philip; Coote, Trevor; Geffern, Eli; et al. (1996). "Behaviour predicts genes structure in a wild primate group". Proceedings of the National Academy of Sciences. 93 (12): 5797–5801. doi:10.1073/pnas.93.12.5797. PMC 39141. PMID 8650172.
- Gesquiere, Laurence R., Bobby Habig, Christina Hansen, Amanda Li, Kimberly Freid, Niki H. Learn, Susan C. Alberts, Andrea L. Graham, and Elizabeth A. Archie. “Noninvasive measurement of mucosal immunity in a free-ranging baboon population.” American Journal of Primatology 82, no. 2 (February 2020): e23093. https://doi.org/10.1002/ajp.23093.
- McLean, Emily M., Elizabeth A. Archie, and Susan C. Alberts. “Lifetime Fitness in Wild Female Baboons: Trade-Offs and Individual Heterogeneity in Quality.” The American Naturalist 194, no. 6 (December 2019): 745–59. https://doi.org/10.1086/705810.
- Fischer, Julia, James P. Higham, Susan C. Alberts, Louise Barrett, Jacinta C. Beehner, Thore J. Bergman, Alecia J. Carter, et al. “Insights into the evolution of social systems and species from baboon studies.” Elife 8 (November 12, 2019). https://doi.org/10.7554/eLife.50989.
- Habig, Bobby, David A. W. A. M. Jansen, Mercy Y. Akinyi, Laurence R. Gesquiere, Susan C. Alberts, and Elizabeth A. Archie. “Multi-scale predictors of parasite risk in wild male savanna baboons (Papio cynocephalus).” Behavioral Ecology and Sociobiology 73, no. 10 (October 2019). https://doi.org/10.1007/s00265-019-2748-y.
- Zipple, Matthew N., Elizabeth A. Archie, Jenny Tung, Jeanne Altmann, and Susan C. Alberts. “Intergenerational effects of early adversity on survival in wild baboons.” Elife 8 (September 24, 2019). https://doi.org/10.7554/eLife.47433.
- Zipple, M. N., E. A. Archie, J. Tung, J. Altmann, and S. C. Alberts. “Intergenerational effects of early adversity on survival in wild baboons.” Elife 8 (September 1, 2019). https://doi.org/10.7554/eLife.47433.001
- Akinyi, Mercy Y., David Jansen, Bobby Habig, Laurence R. Gesquiere, Susan C. Alberts, and Elizabeth A. Archie. “Costs and drivers of helminth parasite infection in wild female baboons.” The Journal of Animal Ecology 88, no. 7 (July 2019): 1029–43. https://doi.org/10.1111/1365-2656.12994.
- Noonan, M. J., M. A. Tucker, C. H. Fleming, T. S. Akre, S. C. Alberts, A. H. Ali, J. Altmann, et al. “A comprehensive analysis of autocorrelation and bias in home range estimation.” Ecological Monographs 89, no. 2 (May 1, 2019). https://doi.org/10.1002/ecm.1344
- Zipple, Matthew N., Eila K. Roberts, Susan C. Alberts, and Jacinta C. Beehner. “Male-mediated prenatal loss: Functions and mechanisms.” Evolutionary Anthropology 28, no. 3 (May 2019): 114–25. https://doi.org/10.1002/evan.21776
- Grieneisen, Laura E., Marie J. E. Charpentier, Susan C. Alberts, Ran Blekhman, Gideon Bradburd, Jenny Tung, and Elizabeth A. Archie. “Genes, geology and germs: gut microbiota across a primate hybrid zone are explained by site soil properties, not host species.” Proceedings. Biological Sciences 286, no. 1901 (April 2019): 20190431. https://doi.org/10.1098/rspb.2019.0431.

== Pages ==
- Silk, Joan B.; Alberts, Susan C. (2003). "Social bonds of female baboons enhance infant survival". Science. 302 (5648): 1231–1234. Bibcode:2003Sci...302.1231S. doi:10.1126/science.1088580. PMID 14615543. S2CID 24970809.
