= Sarah Otto =

Canadian scientist

Sally Otto FRS FRSC
- Born: Sarah Perin Otto; October 23, 1967 (age 58)
- Other name: Sally Otto
- Education: Stanford University (BS, PhD)
- Awards: Darwin–Wallace Medal (2021); Sewall Wright Award (2015); MacArthur Fellows Program (2011)
- Scientific career
- Fields: Evolutionary biology
- Workplaces: University of British Columbia; University of Edinburgh
- Thesis: Evolution in sexual organisms: the role of recombination, ploidy level, and nonrandom mating (1992)
- Doctoral advisor: Marcus Feldman
- Other academic advisors: Nick Barton
- Website: www.zoology.ubc.ca/~otto

Sarah Perin Otto FRS FRSC (born October 23, 1967) is a theoretical biologist, Canada Research Chair in Theoretical and Experimental Evolution, and is currently a Killam Professor at the University of British Columbia. From 2008-2016, she was the director of the Biodiversity Research Centre at the University of British Columbia. Otto was named a 2011 MacArthur Fellow. In 2015 the American Society of Naturalists gave her the Sewall Wright Award for fundamental contributions to the unification of biology. In 2021, she was awarded the Darwin–Wallace Medal for contributing major advances to the mathematical theory of evolution.

== Education ==
Otto received her Bachelor of Science degree in 1988 and followed by her PhD in 1992 from Stanford University.

== Research and career ==
She did post-doctoral research with Nick Barton at the University of Edinburgh. Otto's research focus is a multi-pronged approach of population-genetic mathematical models and statistical tools to understand how evolutionary processes generate diverse biological features. The core of her research revolves around analyzing mathematical models and exploring the insights they yield about how biological systems evolve. Dr. Otto is also the author of the book "A Biologist's Guide to Mathematical Modeling in Ecology and Evolution". Through the analysis and development of stochastic models, Dr. Otto's colleagues and herself have shown how genes are transmitted across generations, the context in which genes are expressed, and how evolutionary constraints influence life trait evolution. The second major component of Dr. Otto's research involves the development of statistical tools such as likelihood-based approaches that allow them to infer how particular traits influence speciation and extinction. This allows us to answer questions such as: Do pollinators promote speciation of colorful flowers? Does genome size influence diversification? According to Otto, her research uses "mathematical models to clarify how features of an organism affect its potential for and rate of adaptation. She also steps back to address why such features vary in the first place. Why is it that some species produce offspring primarily by cloning themselves, whereas others never do? Why do some species have large genomes with many chromosomes, while others are streamlined?" Otto's recent work has investigated the genomic changes that underlie adaptation by yeast to harsh environmental conditions.

=== Science communication ===
Since 2013 Otto has been the director of the Liber Ero Fellowship program, a post-doctoral fellowship program that supports early-career scientists to conduct and communicate research that informs conservation and management issues. In 2006 she co-founded the Canadian Society for Ecology and Evolution. She has also served as the Vice-President and President for The Society for the Study of Evolution, The American Society of Naturalists and The European Society of Evolutionary Biology as well as a council member of The Society for the Study of Evolution and the American Genetic Association.

=== Awards and honours ===
- Elected a Fellow of the Royal Society (FRS) in 2024
- Society for the Study of Evolution Lifetime Achievement Award (2023)
- Killam Prize (2023)
- Darwin–Wallace Medal (2021)
- Canadian Society for Ecology & Evolution President's Award (2017)
- Sewall Wright Award (2015)
- Elected member of (US) National Academy of Sciences (2013)
- Guggenheim Fellowship in Natural Sciences For Research (2011)
- MacArthur Fellowship For Research (2011)
- Steacie Prize (2007)
- Royal Society of Canada Fellow (2006)
- McDowell Award for Excellence in Research (2003)
- NSERC E.W.R. Steacie Memorial Fellowship (2001)
- American Society of Naturalists Jasper Loftus-Hills Young Investigator Award (1995)
