= Ruth Geyer Shaw =

Evolutionary biologist and former editor

Ruth G. Shaw
- Born: 1953
- Education: Oberlin College, Duke University
- Spouse: Frank H. Shaw
- Awards: Sewall Wright Award, 2017
- Scientific career
- Fields: Evolutionary biology, Population genetics
- Workplaces: University of Minnesota

Ruth Geyer Shaw (born 1953) is a professor and principal investigator in the Department of Ecology, Evolution and Behavior at the University of Minnesota. She studies the processes involved in genetic variation, specializing in plant population biology and evolutionary quantitative genetics. Her work is particularly relevant in studying the effects of stressors such as climate instability and population fragmentation on evolutionary change in populations. She has developed and applied new statistical methods for her field and is considered a leading population geneticist.

Shaw has been active on a number of editorial boards, most recently as chief editor of the journal Evolution (2013–2017). She has received several awards including the 2017 Sewall Wright Award from the American Society of Naturalists, given to a senior investigator who continues to make fundamental contributions to "the conceptual unification of the biological sciences".

== Early life ==
Shaw's parent were both chemists and she grew up in Pennsylvania. Shaw has stated that they fostered her interested in the natural world by going on nature walks and consulting field guides to identify plants and birds.

== Education ==
Shaw received her B.A. in biology at Oberlin College. Her interest in the evolution of plants was sparked by a class in vertebrate anatomy taught by Warren Walker. She received her Ph.D. in botany and genetics at Duke University in 1983, working with Janis Antonovics. She then worked as a postdoc with Joseph Felsenstein at the University of Washington.

== Career ==
Shaw was an assistant professor at the University of California, Riverside from 1987 to 1992. In 1993, she joined the Department of Ecology, Evolution and Behavior at the University of Minnesota where she now heads the Ruth G. Shaw Research Group. Shaw was elected into the American Academy of Arts and Sciences in 2018 and into the National Academy of Sciences in 2021.

== Research ==
Shaw is an evolutionary biologist, who studies evolutionary change in nature. She is concerned with stressors such as climate change and population fragmentation and their effects on evolutionary change in populations.

In early work with David N. Reznick, Frank H. Shaw and Helen Rodd, Ruth Shaw examined the effects of predator fish on the experimental evolution of subsequent guppy generations. They studied guppy populations over an 11-year period. They found that descendant guppies who were not directly affected by predation evolved in ways that resembled the life histories of guppies who had lived in predator-free communities. They also found that guppies could evolve extremely quickly, at a rate thousands of darwins faster than the rates of evolutionary changes observed in the fossil record.

In much of her work Shaw has focused on evolutionary processes in plant populations. She uses techniques from quantitative genetics and population biology as well as field experiments to study the evolution of plants such as Echinacea angustifolia. Through empirical studies, she examines evolutionary change in its ecological context. By studying Echinacea angustifolia, she has demonstrated that inbreeding, which frequently affects fragmented populations, can influence key functional traits. Traits related to plant structure, physiology and elemental composition are important to individual fitness and ecological dynamics in populations.

With Margaret Bryan Davis and others, Shaw has examined Paleoclimate change in North American forests, from the Quaternary period onwards. Pollen granules and other plant remains, found in lake sediment cores, can show changes in populations in an area over time. In 2011, Davis, Shaw and Julie R. Etterson received the William Skinner Cooper Award from the Ecological Society of America for the paper "Evolutionary responses to changing climate". In this paper, they synthesized ecological and evolutionary research about plant populations and the effects of rapid climate change, challenging the paradigm that evolutionary responses in the Quaternary period were slow and ineffective. The evidence they presented suggests that evolutionary adaptation does occur in plant populations subjected to the stress of rapid environmental change.

Shaw has also developed new statistical methods, such as aster modeling, with statistician Charles Geyer . Aster Modeling enables the analysis of life history data to obtain estimates of fitness and population growth rates. The importance of Shaw's work on quantitative genetics and analysis of fitness was recognized in 2009 when the American Society of Naturalists gave its President's Award to the paper Unifying Life‐History Analyses for Inference of Fitness and Population Growth. Shaw has also developed Quercus, a quantitative genetics software, that performs a maximum likelihood analysis of variance of quantitative genetic data.

== Mentoring ==
Shaw advises graduate students in the departments of Applied Plant Sciences; Conservation Biology; Ecology, Evolution, and Behavior; and Plant Biological Sciences at the University of Minnesota. Her students have assessed the effect of climate change on adaptation potential of native plants, the evolutionary consequences of gene flow from cultivated plants to naturally occurring plant relatives, and the evolutionary change in introduced species.

== Awards ==
- 2021, National Academy of Sciences Member
- 2018, American Academy of Arts and Sciences Fellow of Ecology, Evolution, and Behavior
- 2017, Sewall Wright Award from the American Society of Naturalists
- 2012, Outstanding Faculty Award from the University of Minnesota Council of Graduate Students
- 2011, Inaugural Outstanding Adviser Award from the Department of Ecology, Evolution and Behavior (EEB) of the University of Minnesota
- 2011, William Skinner Cooper Award from the Ecological Society of America for Davis, Margaret B.; Shaw, Ruth G.; Etterson, Julie R. (July 2005). "Evolutionary responses to changing climate". Ecology. 86 (7): 1704–1714. Bibcode:2005Ecol...86.1704D. doi:10.1890/03-0788. hdl:11299/178230.
- 2009, President's Award from the American Society of Naturalists, for Shaw, Ruth G.; Geyer, Charles J.; Wagenius, Stuart; Hangelbroek, Helen H.; Etterson, Julie R. (July 2008). "Unifying Life-History Analyses for Inference of Fitness and Population Growth". The American Naturalist. 172 (1): E35–E47. Bibcode:2008ANat..172E..35S. doi:10.1086/588063. PMID 18500940. S2CID 9666563.
- 2002-2003, Guggenheim Fellowship for Natural Sciences, John Simon Guggenheim Memorial Foundation
