= H. Bradley Shaffer =

- Born: October 26, 1953 (age 72)
- Education: University of California, Berkeley (B.Sc., 1976); University of Chicago (Ph.D., 1982)
- Known for: Evolution, ecology, and conservation biology of amphibians and reptiles; turtle genomics
- Scientific career
- Fields: Herpetology; Genetics; Conservation biology
- Workplaces: University of California, Irvine; University of California, Davis; University of California, Los Angeles
- Thesis: Evolution in a highly paedomorphic lineage: A case study of the Mexican ambystomatid salamanders (1982)
- Author abbrev. (zoology): Shaffer

Howard Bradley “Brad” Shaffer (born 26 October 1953), sometimes also cited as Howard B. Shaffer, Jr. or in publications most often as H. Bradley Shaffer, is an American herpetologist, geneticist, and conservation biologist.

== Biography ==
Shaffer received his Bachelor of Science degree in June 1976 from the University of California, Berkeley. In 1982, he earned his Ph.D. at the University of Chicago with the dissertation Evolution in a highly paedomorphic lineage: A case study of the Mexican ambystomatid salamanders. From 1983 to 1984 he was a postdoctoral researcher under Russell Lande and William Archley, and also a research associate at the Field Museum of Natural History in Chicago. From 1984 to 1985 he served as a visiting lecturer at the University of Chicago.

From 1985 to 1987 Shaffer was Assistant Professor at the University of California, Irvine. From 1987 to 2012 he was Assistant Professor, then Associate Professor, and finally full Professor at the University of California, Davis. He is now Professor in the Department of Ecology and Evolutionary Biology and at the Institute of Environment and Sustainability of the University of California, Los Angeles (UCLA), and since 2012, Director of the La Kretz Center for California Conservation Science.

His research focuses on the evolution, ecology, and conservation biology of amphibians and reptiles. Current projects of his laboratory include comparative phylogeography of amphibians and reptiles in California and the central United States, systematics of freshwater and land turtles in Australia, California, and other parts of the world, and conservation genetics of threatened Californian amphibians and reptiles. In 2013, Shaffer led an international team of 59 biologists that published the first complete turtle genome.

Shaffer has described several new amphibian species, including Nyctibatrachus aliciae (1984), Nyctibatrachus minor (1984), Oreolalax multipunctatus (1993) and Lithobates kauffeldi (2014). In 2000, he erected the new monotypic turtle genus Leucocephalon for the Sulawesi forest turtle (Leucocephalon yuwonoi).

Since 2003 Shaffer has been a member of the IUCN/SSC Tortoise and Freshwater Turtle Specialist Group and since 2007 of the IUCN/SSC Amphibian Specialist Group. From 2013 to 2015 he was treasurer of the Society of Systematic Biologists. In 2014 he served as president of the American Society of Ichthyologists and Herpetologists. From 2018 to 2021 he was treasurer of the American Genetic Association, of which he had been president in 2010. Since 2012 he has been on the editorial board of the journal Journal of Heredity.

In 2013 he authored the entry on Neoteny in Brenner’s Encyclopedia of Genetics. In 2016 the work California Amphibian and Reptile Species of Special Concern was published, to which he contributed as co-author.

In 2022 Shaffer was elected a member of the American Academy of Arts and Sciences. In 2026, he became a co-editor of the journal Annual Review of Ecology, Evolution, and Systematics.

== Selected works ==
- Shaffer, H. B. (2013). "The western painted turtle genome, a model for the evolution of extreme physiological adaptations in a slowly evolving lineage". Genome Biology. 14 (3): R28. doi:10.1186/gb-2013-14-3-r28. PMC 4054807. PMID 23537068.
