= Sharon Y. Strauss =

American evolutionary ecologist

- Born: 1956 (age 69–70); New York, NY, USA
- Awards: Per Brinck Oikos Award (2013); Sewall Wright Award (2020)

Academic background
- Education: B.A., 1978, Biology, Harvard University; M.S., 1984, Ecology, University of Minnesota; PhD., Biological Sciences, 1988, Florida State University
- Thesis: Interactions among three herbivores and their effects on a shared host plant (1988)

Academic work
- Institutions: University of California, Davis

Sharon Yehudit Strauss (born 1956) is an American evolutionary ecologist. She is a Professor of Evolution and Ecology at the University of California, Davis.

== Early life and education ==
Strauss was born in 1956 in New York. She earned her Bachelor of Arts degree from Harvard University before enrolling in the University of Minnesota and Florida State University for her MA and PhD. While attending Florida State University, she received the 1987 Murray F. Buell Award for Excellence in Ecology from the Ecological Society of America.

== Career ==
Upon completing her PhD, Strauss became a Professor of Evolution and Ecology at the University of California, Davis. In 2001, she co-directed UC Davis Center for Population Biology project titled "Biological Invasions from Genes to Ecosystems, from Science to Society," with Kevin Rice, Holly Doremus, Susan Ustin, and Richard Grosberg. She also co-created EVE 180, an undergraduate course in the Division of Biological Sciences which guided 20 juniors and seniors through a typical research experience, from hypothesis to results written for publication. Two years later, Strauss and doctoral student Richard Lankau co-published the Strauss-Lankau paper, which studied how genetic diversity and species diversity depended on each other for survival. They studied the evolution of Brassica nigra compared to black mustard and plants of other species to reach their conclusion. In 2009, Strauss was elected a fellow of the California Academy of Sciences.

In 2011, Strauss received a 14-day grant from National Geographic to study wildlife in New Zealand for her project Nowhere to run, nowhere to hide: Plant camouflage as an adaptation to enemies. Two years later, she was awarded UC Davis' Distinguished Teaching Awards for Graduate Professional during the 2013 Academic Senate and Academic Federation reception. While serving as chair of the Department of Evolution and Ecology, Strauss was elected a Fellow of the American Academy of Arts and Sciences for "her work in population biology, particularly for contributions in evolutionary history and its interactions with ecology, species evolution as a consequence of community membership, and application of research to solve environmental problems." She was elected a Fellow of the Ecological Society of America in 2015. Her efforts in the department of Evolution and Ecology were recognized by UC Davis with the 2017 Distinguished Mentoring Award. She was elected to the US National Academy of Sciences in 2022.

As of 2025, Strauss is currently a Distinguished Emeritus Professor at UC Davis.
