= Mark D. Rausher =

American evolutionary biologist

- Born: Gary, Indiana, U.S.
- Known for: Plant–herbivore interactions; Coevolution; Evolutionary genetics of floral traits
- Title: John C. Kilgo Distinguished Professor of Biology
- Awards: Sewall Wright Award; Fellow of the American Academy of Arts and Sciences

Academic background
- Education: University of Chicago (B.A.); Cornell University (Ph.D.)

Academic work
- Discipline: Evolutionary biology
- Sub-discipline: Plant–insect interactions
- Institutions: Duke University
- Website: www.duke.edu/~mrausher

Mark D. Rausher is an American evolutionary biologist known for his research on plant–herbivore interactions, coevolution, and the evolutionary genetics of floral traits. He is the John C. Kilgo Distinguished Professor of Biology at Duke University, where he has served on the faculty since 1978. Rausher is a fellow of the American Academy of Arts and Sciences and a recipient of the Sewall Wright Award.

== Early life and education ==
Rausher was born in Gary, Indiana. He earned a B.A. from the University of Chicago in 1973 and a Ph.D. in 1978 from Cornell University, where he conducted research in ecology and evolutionary biology.

== Career ==
Rausher joined the faculty of Duke University in 1978 as an Assistant Professor in the Department of Zoology. He was promoted to Associate Professor in 1983 and to full Professor in 1991. From 1995 to 2000, he served as the Chair of the Department of Zoology. In 2013, he was appointed the John C. Kilgo Distinguished Professor of Biology.

Rausher served as the Editor-in-Chief of The American Naturalist from 1990 to 1995 and as Editor-in-Chief of Evolution from 2006 to 2010. He also served as Evolution Section Head Editor for New Phytologist and served on the editorial boards of Ecology, Ecological Monographs, and Biology Letters.

Rausher served as President Elect, President, and Past President of the Society for the Study of Evolution from 2018 to 2020.

== Research ==
Rausher studies evolutionary biology at both the phenotypic and genetic levels, with a focus on the genetic basis of adaptation and the evolutionary diversification of metabolic pathways. His work examines the molecular genetic basis of phenotypes as well as patterns of natural selection acting on those phenotypes under natural conditions, particularly for ecologically relevant traits.

A major theme of his research is the coevolution of plant defenses and their natural enemies, including herbivores and pathogens, as well as interactions with pollinators, with particular emphasis on members of the morning glory family. His work has produced quantitative evidence of natural adaptation in plant populations and has tested long-standing hypotheses concerning the costs of resistance in plants, diffuse coevolution, and adaptive constraints.

More recent research has explored the genetic changes underlying the evolution of floral color patterning in the genus Clarkia, demonstrating that ancient gene duplications, rather than polyploidization, have facilitated diversification of petal pigmentation patterns.

In collaboration with former graduate student Robin Hopkins, Rausher provided the first empirical example of reinforcing selection acting on a gene responsible for reproductive isolation, based on studies of flower color divergence in two species of Phlox.

Together with former graduate student David L. Des Marais, he also clarified the distinction between neofunctionalization and escape from adaptive conflict through an investigation of gene duplication and divergence in the anthocyanin pigment pathway of the common morning glory (Ipomoea purpurea).

== Selected honors and awards ==
- 1979: Cole Award, Cornell University
- 2016: Sewall Wright Award, American Society of Naturalists
- 2019: Fellow of the American Academy of Arts and Sciences

== Selected publications ==
- Rausher, M. D. (1978). "Search image for leaf shape in a butterfly". Science. 200: 1071–1073.
- Rausher, M. D. (1992). "The measurement of selection on quantitative traits: biases due to environmental covariances between traits and fitness". Evolution. 46: 616–626.
- Fineblum, W. L.; Rausher, M. D. (1995). "Tradeoff between resistance and tolerance to herbivore damage in a morning glory". Nature. 377: 517–520.
- Rausher, M. D. (2001). "Coevolution and plant resistance to natural enemies". Nature. 411: 857–864.
- Des Marais, D. L.; Rausher, M. D. (2008). "Escape from adaptive conflict after duplication in an anthocyanin pathway gene". Nature. 454: 762–765.
- Hopkins, R.; Rausher, M. D. (2011). "Identification of two genes causing reinforcement in the Texas wildflower Phlox drummondii". Nature. 469: 411–415.
- Hopkins, R.; Rausher, M. D. (2012). "Pollinator-mediated selection on flower color allele drives reinforcement". Science. 335: 1090–1092.
- Ostevik, K. L.; Rifkin, J. L.; Xia, H.; Rausher, M. D. (2021). "Morning glory species co-occurrence is associated with asymmetrically decreased and cascading reproductive isolation". Evolution Letters. 5: 75–85.
