= Anjali Goswami =

Paleo-biologist and professor

Professor Anjali Goswami FRS
- Goswami in 2026
- Education: University of Michigan; University of Chicago
- Awards: Bicentenary Medal of the Linnean Society (2016); Zoological Society of London Scientific Medal (2018); Hind Rattan ('Jewel of India') Award (2020); Palaeontological Association President's Medal (2021); Society of Vertebrate Paleontology Robert Lynn Carroll award (2021)
- Scientific career
- Fields: Palaeobiology; Evolutionary Biology
- Workplaces: Natural History Museum (present); Department of Environment, Food, and Rural Affairs (present); University College London; University of Cambridge
- Thesis: The evolution of morphological integration in the mammalian skull (2005)
- Doctoral advisor: John Flynn
- Website: www.goswamilab.com

Professor Anjali Goswami FRS is a Research Leader and former Dean of the Graduate Centre at the Natural History Museum. She is an Honorary Professor of Paleobiology at University College London (UCL) in the Department of Genetics, Evolution, and Environment. She currently serves as Chief Scientific Advisor and Director General of Science, Data, and Analysis for the Department for Environment, Food and Rural Affairs. She served as President of the Linnean Society of London from 2022-2025, the first person of colour elected to this role since its founding in 1788. She was elected Fellow of the Royal Society of London in 2024..

Goswami's expertise is in vertebrate evolution and development, particularly developing new methods for using high-resolution 3D images of specimens to quantify and reconstruct the evolution of biodiversity and understand how development, ecology and large-scale environmental effects have shaped animal evolution through deep time. Her work engaging the public in evolutionary and environmental science includes publication of a children's book on palaeontology, founding of the Natural History Museum's Explorer's Programme and Naturally Curious series, and numerous public lectures and interviews in print, radio, and television.

== Education and early career ==
Goswami spent her undergraduate years (1998) at the University of Michigan, where she focused on how early whales transitioned from the land to the water. After this, she spent time in India at the Bandhavgarh National Park conducting field work in tiger conservation and ecotourism.

In 2005 Goswami earned her doctorate at the University of Chicago and Field Museum of Natural History from the Committee on Evolutionary Biology. Her thesis, titled The Evolution of Morphological Integration In the Mammalian Skull, studied the morphological integration, phenotypic modularity, and developmental trait correlations in 107 species of mammals. These 107 species (98 are extant and 9 are fossil based) include representatives of the monotremes, placentals, and marsupials. During her PhD work, she also conducted field work in Madagascar, India, Chile, Peru, and Western U.S.

== Career ==
After completing her PhD, Goswami began a National Science Foundation international postdoctoral fellowship at the Natural History Museum, London, and then undertook a lectureship position in the Earth Sciences department at the University of Cambridge from 2007 to 2009, where she was a fellow of King's College Cambridge. In 2009 Goswami became a lecturer of Palaeobiology at University College London (UCL) in the Department of Genetics, Evolution, and Environment and the Department of Earth Sciences, with a tertiary affilition in the Department of Cell and Developmental Biology. She was promoted to Reader in 2013 and Professor of Palaeobiology in 2016. In 2017, she became principal investigator and research leader at the Natural History Museum in the Life Sciences. and Honorary Professor of Palaeobiology at University College London.

Outside of her roles at Natural History Museum, University College London, and Department for Environment, Food and Rural Affairs, Goswami has served on several other committees, projects, and societies. She co-directed the London Centre for Ecology and Evolution from 2014 to 2022 and served as Chair of the Program Committee, 'member at large' on the Executive Committee, and as Chair of the Development Committee for the Society of Vertebrate Paleontology between 2009-2022. Goswami also served on the Executive Committee for the International Society for Vertebrate Morphology from 2020-2024 and on the Board of Visitors for the Oxford University Museum of Natural History from 2021-2025. She has served on the editorial boards for Evolution (journal), Annual Review of Ecology, Evolution, and Systematics, Biology Letters, Evolution Letters, Integrative and Comparative Biology, Paleobiology, PLOS One, and Journal of Vertebrate Paleontology.

Goswami's expertise is in macroevolution, phenomics, evolutionary modelling, and vertebrate evolution and developmental biology, particularly using high-resolution 3D images of specimens to quantify and reconstruct the evolution of biodiversity and understand how development, ecology and large-scale environmental effects have shaped animal evolution through deep time . She has searched for fossils all over the world, from Svalbard to Madagascar, and currently leads expeditions in Argentina and India with the aim to improve understanding of the huge change in global biodiversity as a result of the Cretaceous/Paleogene mass extinction 66 million years ago, which ended the dominance of non-avian dinosaurs. Anjali also created and manages www.phenome10k.org, a free online database for 3D biological images for research and education. Her work has been supported by the European Research Council, Leverhulme Trust, National Science Foundation, Natural Environment Research Council, Biotechnology and Biological Sciences Research Council, Royal Society, and National Geographic.

She has published more than 150 scientific articles on quantitative methods for evolutionary analysis and the evolution of different groups from insects to dinosaurs, but her main interest is in the evolution of mammals. Goswami has authored and edited Carnivoran Evolution, a volume which explores the latest scientific understanding of carnivoran relationships, ecomorphology and macroevolutionary patterns.

In 2025 Goswami was appointed Chief Scientific Advisor and Director General of Science, Data, and Analysis at the Department for Environment, Food and Rural Affairs.

== Awards ==
- Bicentenary medal of the Linnean Society (2016).
- Zoological Society of London Scientific Medal (2017)
- Hind Rattan Award (2020)
- President's Medal of the Palaeontological Association (2021)
- Society of Vertebrate Paleontology Robert Lynn Carroll award (2021)
- elected Fellow of the Royal Society (2024)
- Michael Faraday Prize of the Royal Society (2026)
