= Richard F. Johnston =

American ornithologist, academic and author

- Born: July 27, 1925; Oakland
- Died: November 15, 2014 (aged 89)
- Alma mater: University of California, Berkeley
- Occupation: Ornithologist, university teacher
- Employer: New Mexico State University; University of Kansas

Richard Fourness Johnston (July 27, 1925 – November 15, 2014) was an American ornithologist, academic and author. He was born in Oakland, California to Marie Whitney (née Johnson) and Arthur Nathaniel Johnston, a San Francisco Bay Area optician. He developed an early interest in zoology, especially birds. He served in the Army during World War II, and was injured in the European theater. He attended the University of California, Berkeley, where he earned a PhD in biology. In 1958, he joined the Zoology Department at the University of Kansas, Lawrence and became curator of its Natural History Museum. His research interests included the house sparrow (English sparrow) P. domesticus and the feral pigeon C. livia. He was awarded the title of professor emeritus in the Department of Ecology and Evolutionary Biology. He was the founding editor of the scientific journal Annual Review of Ecology and Systematics (1970-1991).

His outside interests included searching for mushrooms, tending to his small vineyard, and making wine. His wife predeceased him; he was survived by their three daughters.

== Works ==
- 1960 Hand-List of the Birds of Kansas. Museum of Natural History, University of Kansas.
- 1964 Directory to the Bird-Life of Kansas. Museum of Natural History, University of Kansas.
- 1964 The Breeding Birds of Kansas. University of Kansas Publications, Museum of Natural History, University of Kansas, Vol. 12, No. 14, pp. 575–655.
- 1965 A Directory to the Birds of Kansas. Museum of Natural History, University of Kansas.
- 1984 Reproductive Ecology of the Feral Pigeon, 'Columba livia'. Occasional papers of the Museum of Natural History, University of Kansas, No. 114.
- 1995 Feral Pigeons (with Marián Janiga). Oxford University Press, ISBN 978-0-19-508409-2.
