= Vanessa Ezenwa =

American ecologist

Vanessa Olivia Ezenwa
- Education: Princeton University; Rice University
- Scientific career
- Workplaces: United States Geological Survey; Odum School of Ecology; Yale University
- Thesis: Behavioral and nutritional ecology of gastrointestinal parasitism in African bovids (2002)

Vanessa Olivia Ezenwa is an American ecologist, and is a professor of ecology and evolutionary biology at Yale University. Her research considers the ecology of infectious diseases amongst animal populations. In 2020, she was selected by The Community of Scholars as one of the most Inspiring Black scientists in the United States.

== Early life and education ==
As a high school student, Ezenwa became interested in infectious diseases and ecology. Ezenwa earned her bachelor's degree at Rice University. She was a graduate student at Princeton University, where she majored in behavioral ecology. Her doctoral research considered eleven different species of African ungulate in Kenya. Some of these ungulates lived in pairs, whilst some lived in groups of one hundred. After completing her doctorate, Ezenwa joined the United States Geological Survey as a postdoctoral fellow.

== Research and career ==
In 2005, Ezenwa joined the faculty at the University of Montana. She moved to the University of Georgia in 2010. Her research considers infectious diseases in animal populations, with a particular focus on identifying effective intervention strategies. She has studied how gastrointestinal worm infections impact the susceptibility of African buffalo to contract bovine tuberculosis, and how severe their diseases are once they have become infected. She concentrated her studies on the free ranging buffalo of Kruger National Park, but the buffalo are a major reservoir of bovine tuberculosis infections in South Africa. The prevalence of the disease in Africa can impact other wildlife. Ezenwa demonstrated that it was possible to treat the worms, diminishing the severity of tuberculosis and increasing the likelihood infected animals survive. Unfortunately, because infected animals survive better, they are more likely to spread the disease. Ezenwa has investigated non-pharmaceutical approaches to managing infectious diseases amongst animals, such as test and cull programmes. Beyond African buffalo, Ezenwa studied Grant's gazelle and spiny mice. Ezenwa has investigated the influence of climate change and changing weather on infectious diseases amongst livestock.

Ezenwa serves on the editorial advisory board of Science. In 2020, Ezenwa was selected by The Community of Scholars as one of the most inspiring Black scientists in the United States.

Ezenwa joined the Yale University staff in 2021, as a professor of ecology and evolutionary biology. Along with 6 of her fellow Yale faculty members, she was elected by the American Association for the Advancement of Science to join its fellowship in 2023. She was elected a Fellow of the Ecological Society of America in 2026.

== Selected publications ==
- Luke R Thompson; Jon G Sanders; Daniel McDonald; et al. (1 November 2017). "A communal catalogue reveals Earth's multiscale microbial diversity". Nature. 551 (7681): 457–463. doi:10.1038/nature24621. ISSN 1476-4687. PMC 6192678. PMID 29088705. Wikidata Q46349678.
- Sonia Altizer; Charles L. Nunn; Peter H. Thrall; et al. (November 2003). "Social Organization and Parasite Risk in Mammals: Integrating Theory and Empirical Studies". Annual Review of Ecology, Evolution, and Systematics. 34 (1): 517–547. doi:10.1146/annurev.ecolsys.34.030102.151725. ISSN 1545-2069. Wikidata Q58066972.
- Vanessa O Ezenwa; Nicole M Gerardo; David W Inouye; Mónica Medina; Joao B Xavier (1 October 2012). "Microbiology. Animal behavior and the microbiome". Science. 338 (6104): 198–199. doi:10.1126/science.1227412. ISSN 0036-8075. PMID 23066064. Wikidata Q43557660.
