= John Novembre =

Computational biologist

- Alma mater: Colorado College; University of California, Berkeley
- Website: jnpopgen.org
- Academic career
- Fields: Population genetics
- Institutions: University of Chicago; University of California, Los Angeles; UCLA Division of Life Sciences (2008–2013)
- Thesis: Statistical methods for neutral and adaptive genetic variation in continuous isolation-by-distance models
- Doctoral advisor: Montgomery Slatkin
- Academic advisor: Matthew Stephens

John Peter Novembre (born 1977 or 1978) is a computational biologist at the University of Chicago. He received a MacArthur Fellowship in 2015. Novembre has developed data visualization and analysis techniques to investigate correlations between genomic diversity, geography, and demographic structure.

== Education ==
Novembre completed his undergraduate education in biochemistry at Colorado College in 2000. He then received a PhD in population genetics in 2006 at UC Berkeley; he was supervised by Montgomery Slatkin. He then went on to do postdoctoral research with Matthew Stephens in Chicago. In 2008, Novembre joined the Department of Ecology and Evolutionary Biology at the University of California, Los Angeles.
