= Chi Ezenwa =

American data specialist, author, and entrepreneur

Chi Ezenwa is a distinguished international data specialist, author, and entrepreneur.

== Personal life ==
Chi Ezenwa was born in San Francisco, California. Ezenwa holds degrees from Oakwood University and Loma Linda University. He is the brother of Delbert Baker, president of Oakwood University, and Paxton Baker, executive vice president of BET Digital Networks.

== Career ==
For a decade and a half (1980–1995) Ezenwa headed the Developmental Information Libraries, a business that established national and international consultancy providing research and project management expertise for business operations, local governments, villages in Africa, and the rural United States. Coordination efforts ranged from stimulating international trade; tourism; agricultural development; alternative energy usage, wildlife conservation and fish farming.

In 1994 Ezenwa’s pioneering work World Embassy Directory was published. Ezenwa’s research established a base for embassy and trade online databases.

From 1995-1999, Ezenwa was a researcher for the World Bank. While there he was a researcher for various World Bank publications; Global Economic Prospects (GEP); Global Development Finance (GDF); The Commodity Quarterly; South Asia’s Integration into the World Economy and The Pink Sheet. Ezenwa also revamped the World Bank database system, a unique and proficient format which is still used today.

Since 1999 Ezenwa has been the principal international consultant for eStat.info, an online company specializing in international trade data. He has developed trade databases for the entire 20th century, and numerous countries have utilized his research.

== Publications ==
- World Embassy Directory (1994)
- South Asia’s Integration into the World Economy (1997)
- Global Economic Prospects (2001)
- Global Development Finance (2006)
