= Jenny Tung =

Evolutionary anthropologist and geneticist

- Occupation: evolutionary anthropologist
- Awards: MacArthur Fellowship

Academic background
- Education: PhD, 2010, Duke University
- Thesis: Functional and Evolutionary Genetics of a Wild Baboon Population (2010)

Jenny Tung is an American evolutionary anthropologist and geneticist. She is the Director of the Department of Primate Behavior and Evolution at the Max Planck Institute for Evolutionary Anthropology in Leipzig, Germany, and a visiting professor of Evolutionary Anthropology and Biology at Duke University. In 2019, she was awarded a MacArthur Fellowship, and in 2024, she was elected a member of the United States National Academy of Sciences. Tung co-directs the Amboseli Baboon Research Project, a long-term study of wild baboons in Kenya.

== Personal life ==
Tung's mother and father immigrated to the United States from Taiwan and moved to Maryland and then to Delaware where they had Tung and her older sister, Wenny. Tung's father was a chemical engineer for DuPont, an American chemical company, and her mother was a teacher prior to their coming to the United States. Upon starting her undergraduate career at Duke University, Tung studied biology with the intent to become a physician, but she discovered her passion lay more in evolutionary biology after a taking a course on forging social ideals during her first semester.

== Education ==
Tung earned a bachelor's degree in 2003 from Duke University. She remained at Duke for her graduate studies, obtaining a PhD in 2010. After a postdoc at the University of Chicago, she came back to Duke University to work as a professor in the field of Evolutionary Anthropology and Biology. Tung founded the Department of Primate Behavior and Evolution at the Max Planck Institute for Evolutionary Anthropology in 2022.

== Research ==
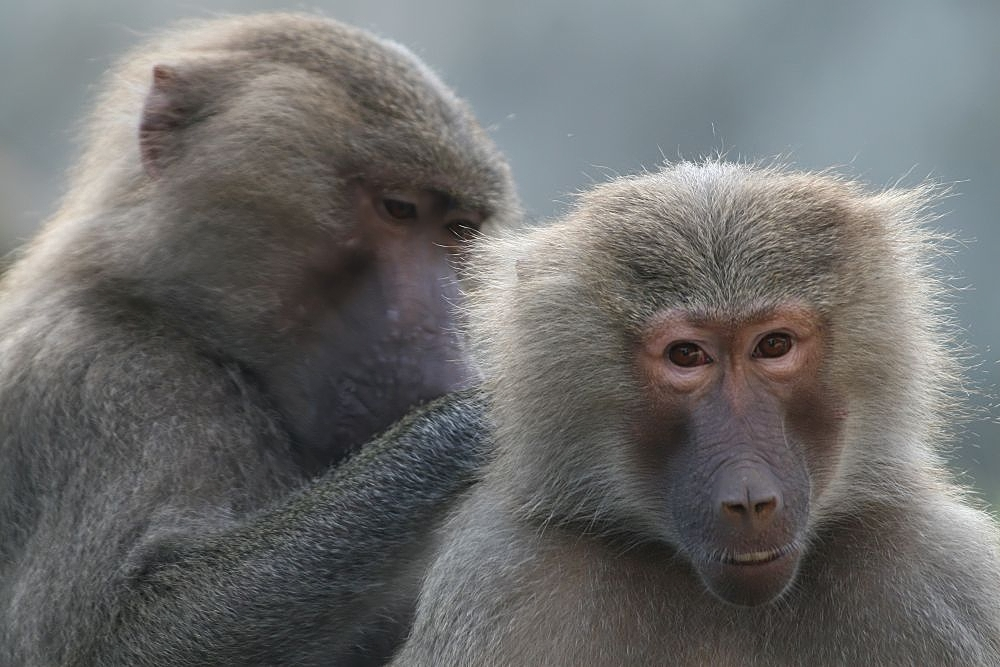
Two yellow baboons (Papio cynocephalus), the species from the study found in Amboseli.

Her research is helping to provide a better understanding for how health, lifespans, and fitness are all affected by social and environmental stressors. Tung's research is focused on primates, but also extends to other social mammals. Tung discovered that the social environment of primates doesn't just influence the physical health and behavior of an individual, but also affects gene regulation. In a different study, she researched the same idea, but in more competitive environments such as wild meerkats. She also looked into how the different social environments affected the rest of the individual's life in terms of: social status, relationships with others, and behavior. She has conducted and contributed to many other projects. Jenny Tung's most cited paper according to Google Scholar is "Social environment is associated with gene regulatory variation in the rhesus macaque immune system". Published in 2012, the paper has been cited by fields ranging from human genomics to bioethics.

== Awards ==
Award name	Year	Institution
Primate Genomics Initiative Graduate Student Fellowship	2009	Duke University
Katherine Goodman Stern Dissertation Year Fellowship	2009	Duke Graduate Program
Chicago Fellows Post-Doctoral Fellowship	2010	University of Chicago
Nominated for Duke Postdoctoral Mentoring Award	2013	Duke University
Sloan Research Fellows	2016	Alfred P. Sloan Foundation
MacArthur Fellows Program	2019	MacArthur Fellowship

Over the years, Tung has received multiple awards and recognitions for her research. In 2009, Tung received the Primate Genomics Initiative Graduate Student Fellowship from Duke University, and the Katherine Goodman Stern Dissertation Year Fellowship from Duke University, which provides recipients with tuition and fee coverage, as well as an annual stipend. The University of Chicago offered her the Chicago Fellows Post-Doctoral Fellowship in 2010. Recipients of the Chicago Fellows Post-Doctoral Fellowship receive an annual stipend as well as research funding. She was nominated for the Duke Postdoctoral Mentoring Award in 2013 from Duke University. The National Academy of Sciences and the Kavli Foundation's international Kavli Frontiers of Science program offered Tung the opportunity to become a Kavli Fellow in 2015. The Kavli Fellows present at their annual Science symposia to network and present their research and is offered to scientists under the age of forty-five. In 2016, Tung received the Sloan Research Fellowship in the field on Computational & Evolutionary Molecular Biology which promoted continuation of her research. Science News listed Tung on the ten scientists to watch list in 2018 for the up-and-coming minds of the natural sciences. Tung was awarded the 2019 MacArthur Fellowship from the MacArthur Foundation, which awarded her with $625,000.
