= Steven Frank (biologist) =

American biologist

Steven A. Frank (born November 8, 1957) is an American evolutionary biologist and Donald Bren Professor and UCI Distinguished Professor of Biological Sciences at the University of California, Irvine.

Frank uses mathematical and computational models to study evolutionary biology, including social evolution, infectious disease, cancer evolution, and the theory of natural selection.

== Education ==
Frank received a B.S. in biology from the University of Michigan in 1979, a master's degree in statistics and a master's degree in zoology from the University of Florida in 1983, and a Ph.D. in biology from the University of Michigan in 1987.

== Career ==
After completing his doctorate, Frank held a Miller Research Fellowship at the University of California, Berkeley from 1987 to 1989. He joined the faculty at the University of California, Irvine in 1988 as an assistant professor, was promoted to associate professor in 1992, and to full professor in 1997. He was named UCI Distinguished Professor in 2015 and Donald Bren Professor in 2016.

Frank has held visiting appointments at several research institutions, including the Wissenschaftskolleg zu Berlin (Institute for Advanced Study) three times (1996–1997, 2006–2007, and 2014–2015), the Institute for Advanced Study in Princeton (2002), the Santa Fe Institute (2009), the University of Chicago as Hogge-Baer Visiting Professor in Cancer Research (2011–2012), and ETH Zürich as Velux Visiting Professor and later Visiting Professor (2013 and 2018–2019).

== Honors and awards ==
- Early Career Investigator Award, American Society of Naturalists, 1987
- Miller Research Fellowship, University of California, Berkeley, 1987–1989
- Theodosius Dobzhansky Prize, Society for the Study of Evolution, 1988
- Presidential Young Investigator Award, National Science Foundation, 1990
- NIH FIRST Award, 1990
- John Simon Guggenheim Fellowship, 1995
- Fellow, American Association for the Advancement of Science, elected 2009
- Fellow, American Academy of Arts and Sciences, elected 2012

== Research topics ==
Frank's research began with empirical work on fig wasps and later expanded into theoretical studies in evolutionary biology. His research has included social evolution, infectious disease, cancer evolution, and the mathematical foundations of natural selection.

Frank's work on social evolution includes the 1998 book Foundations of Social Evolution. Reviewers discussed its treatment of the Price equation, relatedness, and kin selection theory. Alan Grafen later wrote that Frank's work helped extend optimization methods in social evolution.

Frank's research has also addressed infectious disease and cancer evolution. Reviewers of Immunology and Evolution of Infectious Disease and Dynamics of Cancer discussed his use of evolutionary and mathematical approaches to disease processes.

The fig wasp Pegoscapus franki was named after Frank in recognition of his early work on fig wasps.
