= Paxton Baker =

American businessman, entrepreneur and philanthropist

Paxton K. Baker
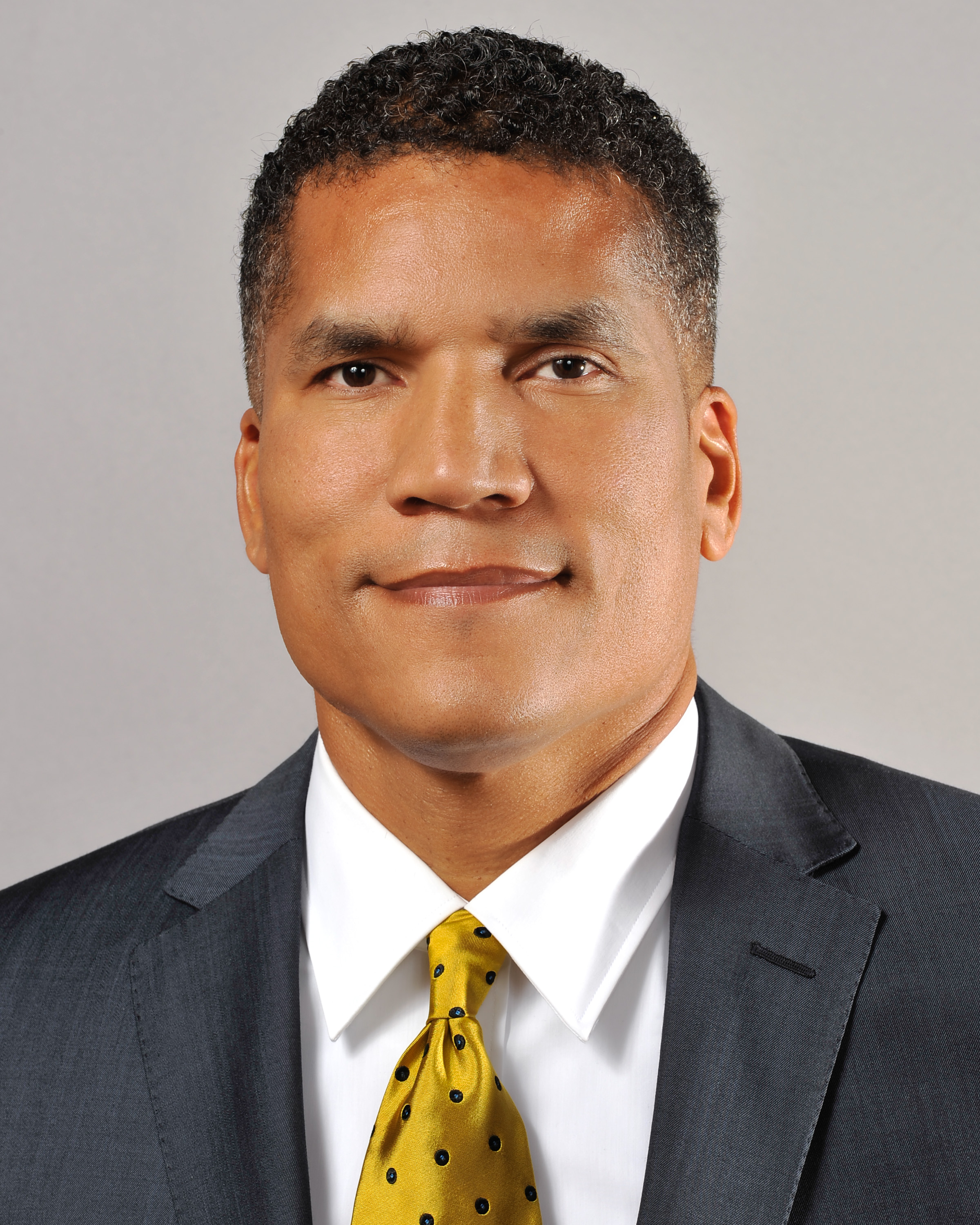
- Baker in 2010
- Education: Temple University
- Occupation: Businessman
- Children: 3

Paxton K. Baker is an American businessman, who has worked in the entertainment, music, sports and production industries for over 30 years.

Baker is a minority owner of the Washington Nationals Baseball club and is chairman of the Washington Nationals Founding Partners Group. In 2015, Baker became a partner in the ownership group of the Washington Kastles World Team Tennis League. He is also a governing board member of the Global Sports Summit.

He is also currently a part of the ownership groups for the Old Glory DC Rugby Football Club and Cape Town Tigers Basketball Club, which competes in the NBA Africa/Basketball Africa League (BAL). In 2024, Baker became a part of the ownership groups for the Brisbane Bullets (NBL) and Barcelona Dragons (ELF).

== Early life and education ==
Baker was born in Los Angeles, California and received his bachelor's degree in liberal studies from Temple University in Philadelphia, Pennsylvania. As a student, Baker was a host on Temple's listener-supported radio station WRTI, which led to his start producing concerts and events.

== Career ==
For nearly 15 years, Baker was president of BET Event Productions, which produced music festivals, TV awards shows, specials and concerts throughout the world. While at BET, Baker produced several major award shows including the BET Experience (2014), Soul Train Awards (2009-2014), The Source Awards (2006–2007) and Billboard Jazz Awards (2001). He also produced numerous notable and historic specials, concerts and documentaries. In 2013, he was the Executive Producer of the United Nations Day in conjunction with Stevie Wonder at the General Assembly Hall at United Nations Headquarters in New York, celebrating the 67th anniversary of the UN's peacekeeping and crisis management efforts around the globe. He was the executive producer of the Marian Anderson 75th Anniversary Celebration of Historic Concert on the Lincoln Memorial in Washington, D.C., and the 50th Anniversary Concert celebrating the historic march from Selma to Montgomery in Alabama.

== Other ==
Affiliated with a number of professional, civic and cultural organizations, Baker is a member of the board of directors for the Herbie Hancock Institute of Jazz, and past member of the Washington Performing Arts, DC Public Education Fund, the United States Senate Preservation Trust, and the Asia Jazz Festival Organization.

In 2006, Baker was appointed by the Speaker of the U.S. House of Representatives to serve as a member of The Congressional Award Foundation national board of directors, the only official charity of the United States Congress. Shortly thereafter he was elected to serve as vice chairman and then chairman of the board in 2007.
