= Annual Review of Ecology, Evolution, and Systematics =

- Discipline: Ecology, evolutionary biology, and systematics
- Language: English
- Edited by: H. Bradley Shaffer

Publication details
- Former names: Annual Review of Ecology and Systematics (1970–2002)
- History: 1970–present, 56 years old
- Publisher: Annual Reviews (US)
- Frequency: Annually
- Open access: Subscribe to Open
- Impact factor: 12.9 (2025)

Standard abbreviations
- ISO 4: Annu. Rev. Ecol. Evol. Syst.

Indexing
- CODEN: ARECBC
- ISSN: 1545-2069 (print); 1545-2069 (web)
- LCCN: 2003213237
- OCLC no.: 51651460

Links
- Journal homepage

The Annual Review of Ecology, Evolution, and Systematics is an annual scientific journal published by Annual Reviews (AR). The journal was established in 1970 as the Annual Review of Ecology and Systematics and changed its name beginning in 2003 to the Annual Review of Ecology, Evolution, and Systematics. It publishes invited review articles on topics considered to be timely and important in the fields of ecology, evolutionary biology, and systematics. As of 2023, it is being published as open access, under the Subscribe to Open model. As of 2026, Journal Citation Reports gave the journal a 2025 impact factor of 12.9, ranking it fourth of 205 journals in the "Ecology" category and third of 54 journals in "Evolutionary Biology".

== History ==
The Annual Review of Ecology and Systematics was first published in 1970 by Annual Reviews (AR), a nonprofit organization whose stated mission is to synthesize knowledge "for the progress of science and the benefit of society." Its first editor was Richard F. Johnston. In 1975 it began publishing biographies of notable ecologists in the prefatory chapter. In 2003, its name was changed to its current form, the Annual Review of Ecology, Evolution, and Systematics.

It defines its scope as covering significant developments in the field of ecology, evolution, and systematics of all life on earth. This includes reviews about molecular evolution, phylogeny, speciation, population dynamics, conservation biology, environmental resource management, and the study of invasive species.

As of 2026, Journal Citation Reports gave the journal a 2025 impact factor of 12.9, ranking it fourth of 205 journals in the "Ecology" category and third of 54 journals in "Evolutionary Biology". It is abstracted and indexed in Scopus, Science Citation Index Expanded, Aquatic Sciences and Fisheries Abstracts, BIOSIS, and Academic Search, among others.

== Editorial processes ==
The Annual Review of Ecology, Evolution, and Systematics is helmed by the editor or the co-editors. The editor is assisted by the editorial committee, which includes associate editors, regular members, and occasionally guest editors. Guest members participate at the invitation of the editor, and serve terms of one year. All other members of the editorial committee are appointed by the AR board of directors and serve five-year terms. The editorial committee determines which topics should be included in each volume and solicits reviews from qualified authors. Unsolicited manuscripts are not accepted. Peer review of accepted manuscripts is undertaken by the editorial committee.

=== Editors of volumes ===
Dates indicate publication years in which someone was credited as a lead editor or co-editor of a journal volume. The planning process for a volume begins well before the volume appears, so appointment to the position of lead editor generally occurred prior to the first year shown here. An editor who has retired or died may be credited as a lead editor of a volume that they helped to plan, even if it is published after their retirement or death.

- Richard F. Johnston (1970–1991)
- Daphne Gail Fautin (1992–2001)
- Douglas J. Futuyma (2002–2026)
- H. Bradley Shaffer (2026–present)

=== Current editorial committee ===
As of 2025, the editorial committee consists of the editor and the following members:

- Aimée Classen
- Anjali Goswami
- Mary I. O'Connor
- Gil G. Rosenthal
- Michael Turelli

Previous members were (as of 2022):

- Anjali Goswami
- H. Bradley Shaffer
- Daniel Simberloff
- Judith Bronstein
- Aimée Classen
- Kathleen Donohue
- James A. Estes
- Anjali Goswami
- Michael Turelli
- Stuart West

== See also ==
- List of biology journals
- List of environmental journals
