= Russell Lande =

American evolutionary biologist and ecologist (born 1951)

Russell Scott Lande
- Born: Russell Scott Lande; 1951 (age 74–75); United States
- Education: University of California, Irvine, University of Chicago, Harvard University
- Known for: population biology, quantitative genetics, evolutionary biology, conservation biology
- Awards: Sewall Wright Award, Guggenheim Fellowship, MacArthur Fellowship, Weldon Memorial Prize and Medal, Balzan Prize, Fellow of the Royal Society, United States National Academy of Sciences
- Scientific career
- Fields: Biology, Genetics
- Workplaces: University of Chicago, University of Oregon, University of California, San Diego, Imperial College London, Norwegian University of Science and Technology
- Doctoral advisor: Richard Lewontin

Russell Scott Lande FRS (born 1951) is an American evolutionary biologist and ecologist, and an International Chair Professor at Centre for Biodiversity Dynamics at the Norwegian University of Science and Technology (NTNU). He is a fellow of the Royal Society and a member of the United States National Academy of Sciences.

== Education and career ==
He received his Ph.D. in 1976 from Harvard University where he was a student of Richard Lewontin, and completed his Postdoctoral work at the University of Wisconsin under James F. Crow. He then held positions at the University of Chicago, University of Oregon, University of California, San Diego, and Imperial College London.

In 2016, he was employed as an International Chair Professor at the Norwegian University of Science and Technology (NTNU).

== Work ==
Lande is best known for his early work extending quantitative genetics theory to the context of evolutionary biology in natural populations. In particular, he developed a stochastic theory for the evolution of quantitative traits by genetic drift and natural selection. He also proposed a multivariate framework to describe the effect of selection on multiple correlated characters, thus helping clarify the much-debated notion of genetic constraints in phenotypic evolution. He later applied and extended these results to study a wide variety of topics in evolutionary biology, including: sexual selection, speciation, the evolution of phenotypic plasticity, of self-fertilization, of life history, of a species range in space and time.

Apart from his work in evolutionary genetics, Lande has substantially contributed to the fields of population dynamics and conservation biology. In particular, his model on the effect of habitat fragmentation on the extinction threshold of territorial species was central to the debate about the conservation of the Northern spotted owl in the Pacific Northwest. He and Georgina Mace contributed to clarify the categories for the IUCN red list, by proposing new criteria based on measurable quantities relating to times to extinction. He is a specialist of stochastic population dynamics, on which he co-authored a book with Steinar Engen and Bernt-Erik Sæther, and of methods for estimating density dependence from time series of population density.

Some of the concepts and tools he introduced, such as the phenotypic selection gradient (univariate or multivariate, directional or quadratic) and the G matrix, have become standard in evolutionary biology.

== Publications ==
- Russell Lande publications indexed by Google Scholar

=== Books ===
- Lande et al 2003. Stochastic Population Dynamics in Ecology and Conservation
- Bernt-Erik Sæther, Steinar Engen and Russell Lande: Finite metapopulation models with density-dependent migration and stochastic local dynamics. London: Royal Society, 1999.(Reprint from Proceedings of the Royal Society of London. B, 226(1999)

=== Representative articles ===
- Lande, R. 1976. Evolution. Natural Selection and Random Genetic Drift in Phenotypic Evolution
- Lande, R. 1981. PNAS. Models of speciation by sexual selection on polygenic traits
- Lande, R. and S. J. Arnold. 1983. Evolution. The Measurement of Selection on Correlated Characters
- Lande, R. 1987. American Naturalist. Extinction Thresholds in Demographic Models of Territorial Populations.
- Lande, R. 1988. Science. Genetics and demography in biological conservation.
- Lande, R. 1993. American Naturalist. Risks of Population Extinction from Demographic and Environmental Stochasticity and Random Catastrophes.
- Lande, R. et al. 2002. American Naturalist. Estimating Density Dependence from Population Time Series Using Demographic Theory and Life‐History Data.

== Honours and awards ==
- Sewall Wright Award 1992
- Guggenheim Fellowship 1996
- MacArthur Fellowship 1997
- Weldon Memorial Prize and Medal 2010
- Balzan Prize 2011
- Fellow of the Royal Society 2012
- Elected member, United States National Academy of Sciences 2015
- Outstanding Paper Award, The Wildlife Society (TWS) 2015

== Sources ==
- Fisch, Florian «“Who’s Going to Speak up for Nature?”». In: Lab Times, 1/2012, pp. 20–25 (Interview with Russell Lande)
- International Balzan Prize Foundation's biographical and bibliographical data on Lande
