= Susan Ustin =

American earth scientist

Susan Lee Ustin
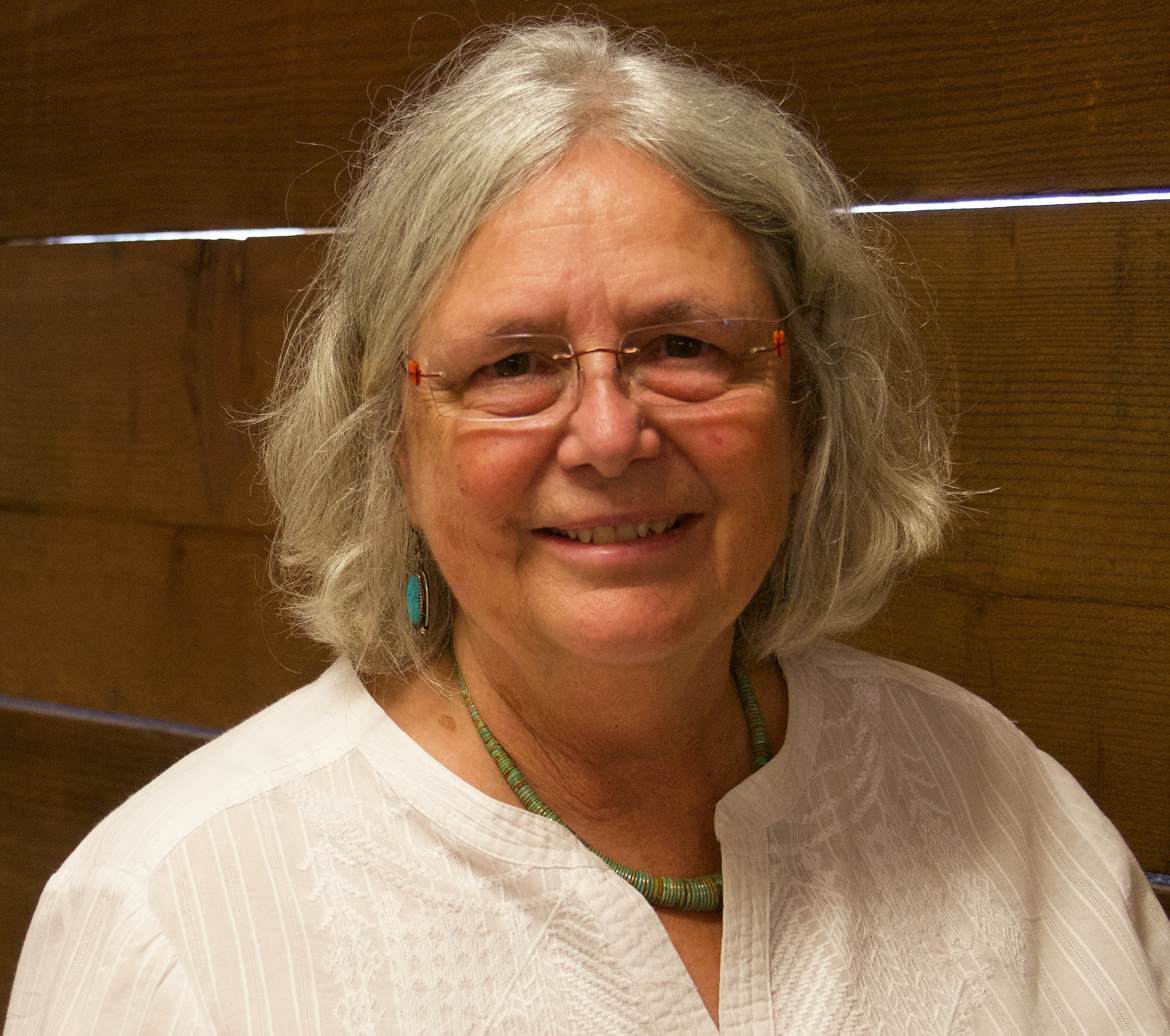
- Ustin in 2017
- Education: California State University, East Bay; University of California, Davis
- Scientific career
- Workplaces: University of California, Davis
- Thesis: Ecophysiological responses to salinity in three closely related Scirpus species (Cyperaceae). (1983)

Susan Ustin is an American earth scientist who is the Distinguished Professor of Environmental Resource Science at the John Muir Institute for the Environment, University of California, Davis. Her research makes use of remote sensing technology to understand the characteristics of plant communities.

== Early life and education ==
Ustin is from Eugene, Oregon. After graduating from high school in 1961, Ustin moved to San Francisco with her friends. She was inspired by the city's activism, in particular the civil rights movement and environmental advocates. She first studied biology at California State University, East Bay, specialising in plant physiological ecology. She remained there for a master's degree, before moving to the University of California, Davis for her doctoral degree. Alongside her doctoral research Ustin started working at the Jet Propulsion Laboratory. She started working on remote sensing technology in the early 1980s, when the field was then in its infancy.

== Research and career ==
Her work considers remote sensing of environmental and landscape properties, making use of hyperspectral analysis and thermal scanners. Remote sensing has since been used to monitor natural disasters, study climate changes and monitor air pollution. Over the course of her career, Ustin made use of remote sensing data from five different continents, including tracking the impacts of agriculture on forests and monitoring invasive plant species.

Ustin held several positions at University of California, Davis, including serving as Director of both the Center for Spatial Technology and Remote Sensing and the John Muir Institute of the Environment. She worked with NASA to build space-based imaging spectrometers.

In 2020 Ustin was elected to the Ecological Society of America. Her citation read,

“Elected for research pioneering the use of remote sensing technology for detecting changes in plant community characteristics, biological diversity, and land use, and for her continued influence on the field,”.

== Awards ==
- 2010 Honorary Doctorate from the University of Zurich
- 2017 Elected Fellow of the American Geophysical Union
- 2020 Elected Fellow of the Ecological Society of America

== Selected publications ==
- Roberts, D.A.; Gardner, M.; Church, R.; Ustin, S.; Scheer, G.; Green, R.O. (1998). "Mapping Chaparral in the Santa Monica Mountains Using Multiple Endmember Spectral Mixture Models". Remote Sensing of Environment. 65 (3): 267–279. Bibcode:1998RSEnv..65..267R. doi:10.1016/s0034-4257(98)00037-6. ISSN 0034-4257.
- Jacquemoud, Stéphane; Verhoef, Wout; Baret, Frédéric; Bacour, Cédric; Zarco-Tejada, Pablo J.; Asner, Gregory P.; François, Christophe; Ustin, Susan L. (2009-09-01). "PROSPECT+SAIL models: A review of use for vegetation characterization". Remote Sensing of Environment. Imaging Spectroscopy Special Issue. 113: S56–S66. Bibcode:2009RSEnv.113S..56J. doi:10.1016/j.rse.2008.01.026. ISSN 0034-4257.
- Smith, Milton O.; Ustin, Susan L.; Adams, John B.; Gillespie, Alan R. (1990). "Vegetation in deserts: I. A regional measure of abundance from multispectral images". Remote Sensing of Environment. 31 (1): 1–26. Bibcode:1990RSEnv..31....1S. doi:10.1016/0034-4257(90)90074-v. ISSN 0034-4257.

=== Books ===
- Ustin, Susan L., ed. (2004). Remote sensing for natural resource management and environmental monitoring. Hoboken, NJ: John Wiley & Sons. ISBN 0-471-31793-4. OCLC 55950983.
- Jacquemoud, Stéphane. Leaf Optical Properties. Ustin, Susan. Cambridge. ISBN 978-1-108-68645-7. OCLC 1117650759.
