= Aimée Classen =

American ecologist

- Education: Smith College; Northern Arizona University
- Scientific career
- Fields: Ecology and Evolutionary Biology, Effects of Climate change
- Workplaces: University of Michigan, University of Tennessee, University of Vermont, Natural History Museum of Denmark, University of Copenhagen, Victoria University of Wellington
- Website: https://classenlab.com/

Aimée Classen is an American ecologist who studies the impact of global changes on a diverse array of terrestrial ecosystems. Her work is notable for its span across ecological scales and concepts, and the diversity of terrestrial ecosystems that it encompasses, including forests, meadows, bogs, and tropics in temperate and boreal climates.

She is currently the director of the University of Michigan's Biological Station (UMBS), a student and faculty research organization at the university devoted to studying various types of environmental change. Classen is editor-in-chief of the Ecological Society of America (ESA) journal Ecological Monographs.

== Education ==
Classen attended Smith College, in Massachusetts, where she completed her bachelor's degree in biology in 1995. She then went on to graduate studies at Northern Arizona University, where she obtained her PhD in biology in 2004. Afterwards, in 2005 she completed her postdoctorate fellowship at the Oak Ridge National Laboratory in Tennessee and continued there as a staff scientist until 2008.

== Career ==
Classen began her first teaching position as an assistant professor in the Department of Ecology and Evolutionary Biology at the University of Tennessee-Knoxville. In 2015, she became an adjunct associate professor at the university. During this period, she began to hold multiple positions at a time. From 2014 to 2018, she served as an associated professor at the Natural History Museum of Denmark in Copenhagen. During that same time, she became a faculty member in the Center of Macroecology at the University of Copenhagen in 2014 and an adjunct professor at the Victoria University of Wellington in New Zealand in 2016, positions which she continues to hold today. Finally, from 2018 to 2020, Classen served four simultaneous roles at the University of Vermont: professor for the Rubenstein School at the University of Vermont, director for the George D. Aiken Forestry Sciences Laboratory, fellow of the Gund Institute for Environment, and adjunct professor for the Department of Biology.

Classen's most recent appointments are as professor of ecology and evolutionary biology at the University of Michigan and director of the University of Michigan Biological Station. She was appointed to the directorship in the summer of 2020.

== Research ==
Classen studies diverse ecosystems worldwide to predict how climate change will alter ecosystems including forests, meadows, and bogs in the tropical zone and boreal and temperate climates. She also studies organisms in soil and the effects of biodiversity underground on ecosystems. Her research on soil microbes is important to understanding mechanisms such as carbon storage and the impact of climate change.

Classen participated in a second phase of the "Warming Meadows" project. Warming Meadows was started by John Harte. From 1991-2019, Harte heated target plots of soil at the Rocky Mountain Biological Laboratory to simulate the effects of increased temperature due to global warming. Heated and unheated plots were matched to control for differences other than temperature. Heat dried the surface soil, nearly reversing the populations of woody shrubs like sagebrush and forbs (broad-leafed herbaceous plants) by year 27 of the project. This also changed the albedo of the area: with woody shrubs absorbing almost double the energy of wildflowers, In a second phrase of the project, scientists including Classen gathered samples from the plants and soil, to examine the effects of those decades of rising temperatures on species below ground.

By monitoring 60 different sites in the Tibetan Plateau she has been able to study biodiversity in alpine grassland under varying climate conditions involving temperature, rainfall, and soil acidity. This is enabling scientists to better understand ecosystems in terms of multiple functions which they provide, how those functions are controlled and how they may be effected by climate change.

Classen was a principal investigator (PI) for WaRM, a project measuring the impact of direct and indirect effects of warming on mountain landscapes in 10 nations and 5 continents. In research reported in Nature (2017) she and her colleagues used changes in elevation as a surrogate for changes in temperature. Examining nutrient cycles at different elevations, they were able to predict that changes in temperature are likely to cause imbalances between nitrogen and phosphorus cycles at high elevation treelines and disrupt montane ecosystems.

In 2020, Classen and Appala Raju Badireddy received a Gund Institute Catalyst Award to develop low-cost, flexible sensors to better study biogeochemical responses such as changes in soil nutrients like nitrogen in extreme environments.

In addition to soil, Classen has studied the relationships between large animals, parasites and ecosystems. A study focused on the relationship between infectious diseases in ruminants and methane release, reporting that sick animals produced more methane. Classen described the interaction between climate's effects on disease and disease's impact on climate as a "vicious cycle".

As part of an interdisciplinary partnership between The Living Earth Collaborative at Washington University in St. Louis, the Missouri Botanical Garden and the Saint Louis Zoo, Classen has helped to model the impact of herbivore parasites on the broader ecosystems of which they are a part. Researchers found that non-lethal parasites reduced the feeding rates of caribou, reindeer, and other herbivores, which in turn decreased their impact on plants and lichens and available biomass. The research is an example of how frequently overlooked factors in an ecosystem can have significant ecological consequences.

In 2020, Classen was recognized by the Ecological Society of America (ESA) for: “creative leadership and vision for international research collaborations using mountain ecosystems as models for climate change research… and for stellar research contributions to the ecology of global environmental change, including how soil microbial diversity shapes ecosystems, and environmental controls on soil nutrient cycling and carbon storage.”

== Honors and awards ==
- 1991–1993. NCAA All-American in swimming
- 1995. Sigma Xi
- 1995. Smith College Brown Botany Prize
- 2002. Best paper, Soil Science Society of America S-7
- 2002–2003. Merriam-Powell Center for Environmental Research Graduate Fellow
- 2006. US Department of Energy Outstanding Mentor Award
- 2007. Promising young scholar, The US National Academy of Sciences Frontiers in Science
- 2007. Kavli Foundation Science Fellow
- 2007. Best paper, Soil Science Society of America S-7
- 2012. UT College of Arts and Sciences Research and Creative Achievement Award
- 2012. Pi Beta Phi teaching award
- 2014. Promising young scholar, The US National Academy of Sciences, Frontiers in Science
- 2015. Association for Women Soil Scientists Mentoring Award - to recognize individuals (male or female) who have made significant contributions to the education, professional growth, & achievement of females in soil science
- 2020. Fellow, Ecological Society of America (ESA)
- 2020. Gund Institute Catalyst Award
- 2023. Fellow of the American Association for the Advancement of Science
