= Selection gradient =

A selection gradient describes the relationship between a character trait and a species' relative fitness. A trait may be a physical characteristic, such as height or eye color, or behavioral, such as flying or vocalizing. Changes in a trait, such as the amount of seeds a plant produces or the length of a bird's beak, may improve or reduce their relative fitness. Changes in traits may accumulate in a population under an ongoing process of natural selection. Understanding how changes in a trait affect fitness helps evolutionary biologists understand the nature of evolutionary pressures on a population.

== Relationship between traits and fitness ==
In a population, heritable traits that increase an organism's ability to survive and reproduce tend to increase in frequency over generations through a process known as natural selection. The selection gradient shows how much an organism's relative fitness (ω) changes in response to a given increase or decrease in the value of a trait. It is defined as the slope of that relationship, which may be linear or more complex. The shape of the selection gradient function also can help identify the type of selection that is acting on a population. When the function is linear, selection is directional. Directional selection favors one extreme of a trait over another. An individual with the favored extreme value of the trait will survive more than others, causing the mean value of that trait in the population to shift in the next generation. When the relationship is quadratic, selection may be stabilizing or disruptive. Stabilizing selection reduces variation in a trait within a population by reducing the frequencies of more extreme values. Individuals with intermediate phenotypes will survive more than others. As a result, the values of the trait in the population in the following generation will cluster more closely around the peak of the population mean. Disruptive selection increases variation by increasing the frequencies of the more extreme values of a trait. Individuals with extreme trait values will survive more than those with intermediate phenotypes, leading to two peaks in frequency at the extreme values of the trait.

== Calculation ==
The first and most common function to estimate fitness of a trait is linear ω =α +βz, which represents directional selection. The slope of the linear regression line (β) is the selection gradient, ω is the fitness of a trait value z, and α is the y-intercept of the fitness function. Here, the function indicates either an increase or decrease in fitness with increases in the value of a trait. The second fitness function is nonlinear ω = α +βz +(γ/2)z^{2} _{,} which represents stabilizing or disruptive selection. The quadratic regression (γ) is the selection gradient, ω is the fitness of a trait value z, and α is the y-intercept of the fitness function. Here, individuals with intermediate trait values may have the highest fitness (stabilizing selection) or those with extreme trait values may have the highest fitness (disruptive selection). When, β = 0 and γ is significantly positive, the selection gradient indicates disruptive selection. When, β= 0 and γ is significantly negative, the selection gradient indicates stabilizing selection. In both the cases γ measures the strength of selection.

== Application ==
Evolutionary biologists use estimates of the selection gradient of traits to identify patterns in the evolutionary pressures on a population and predict changes in species traits. When traits are correlated with one another to some degree, for example beak length (z_{1}) and body size (z_{2}) in a bird, selection on one will affect the distribution of the other. For correlated traits, the effects of natural selection can be separated by estimating the selection gradient for one trait (beak length (z_{1})) while holding the other trait (body size (z_{2)}) constant. The process enables researchers to determine how greatly variations in one trait (beak length) affect fitness among individuals with the same body size. In 1977 when the Galapagos Islands suffered from severe drought, Peter and Rosemary Grant estimated the selection gradient for Darwin's finches to estimate the strength of the relationship between fitness and each trait while holding other traits constant. They estimated selection gradient for finches' weight (0.23), bill length (-0.17) and bill depth (0.43). The result showed that selection strongly favored larger birds with deeper bills. Evolutionary biologists also use selection gradients to estimate strength and mode of natural selection. Selection gradients, for example, have provided an explanation for fitness differences among individuals in a population, among different species and strengths of selection. In a study of the fresh-water Eurasian perch, a change in fitness was reported with a change in their density. An estimate of the selection gradient by linear and quadratic regression indicated a shift of the selection regime between stabilizing and directional selection at low density to disruptive selection at higher density.

== Criticism ==
Despite the conceptual simplicity of the selection gradient, there are ongoing debates about its usefulness as an estimator of causes and consequences of natural selection. In 2017, Franklin & Morrissey showed that when performance measures such as body size, biomass, or growth rate are used in place of fitness components in regression-based analysis, accurate estimation of selection gradient is limited, which may lead to under-estimates of selection. Another complication of using selection gradient as an estimator of natural selection is when the phenotype of an individual is itself affected by individuals it interacts with. It complicates the process of separating direct and indirect selection as there are multiple ways selection can work. One alternative to selection gradients is the use of high throughput sequencing to identify targets and agents of selection.

== See also ==
- Charles Darwin
- On the Origin of Species
- Evolution
- Natural selection
- Directional selection
- Stabilizing selection
- Disruptive selection
