= Amboseli Baboon Research Project =

Research project on yellow baboons in southern Kenya

The Amboseli Baboon Project is a long-term, individual-based research project on yellow baboons (Papio cynocephalus) in the Amboseli basin of southern Kenya. Founded in 1971, it is one of the longest-running studies of a wild primate in the world. Research at the Amboseli Baboon Project centers on processes at the individual, group, and population levels, and in recent years has also included other aspects of baboon biology, such as genetics, hormones, nutrition, hybridization, parasitology, and relations with other species. The project is affiliated with the Department of Ecology and Evolutionary Biology at Princeton University, the Department of Biology and the Evolutionary Anthropology Department at Duke University, the Department of Biological Sciences at the University of Notre Dame, and the Department of Primate Behavior and Evolution at the Max Planck Institute for Evolutionary Anthropology.

The Amboseli Baboon Project is based in the Amboseli National Park and southwestern parts of the Amboseli ecosystem, near Kilimanjaro. Its primary research camp is based on the southern border of Amboseli National Park, near the former Olgulului Public Campsite.

== Background ==
The initial study of the project ran in 1963 - 1964, with a brief follow-up study in 1969. These laid the groundwork for the long-term, coordinated project which began in 1971. Since then, individually recognized baboons within the study groups have been followed on a near-daily basis.

The project was founded by Stuart Altmann and Jeanne Altmann (member of the United States National Academy of Sciences).

== Present day ==
The project is currently co-directed by Susan Alberts, Beth Archie and Jenny Tung. The majority of the project's observational data are collected by long-term field observers in Kenya.

Its funding has come from a number of sources over the years, including the National Science Foundation, National Institutes of Health, and the Max Planck Institute for Evolutionary Anthropology. The software developed by the project to manage the collected data, Babase, is produced with Open-source software and is itself Open-source software and available to the public. Over the period of its existence The Amboseli Baboon Project has produced over 230 peer-reviewed articles, reports, and popular accounts.

== Discoveries ==
- Close social relationships among females improve their offsprings' chance of survival
- Young baboons who grow up without a father reach adulthood more slowly
- Mothers with low social status have sons with higher baseline stress levels
- Male baboons seem to identify their offspring and support them in conflicts
- Alpha and low-ranking males experience high stress, while beta males do not
