= Judith Bronstein =

American ecologist and evolutionary biologist

Judith Lee Bronstein
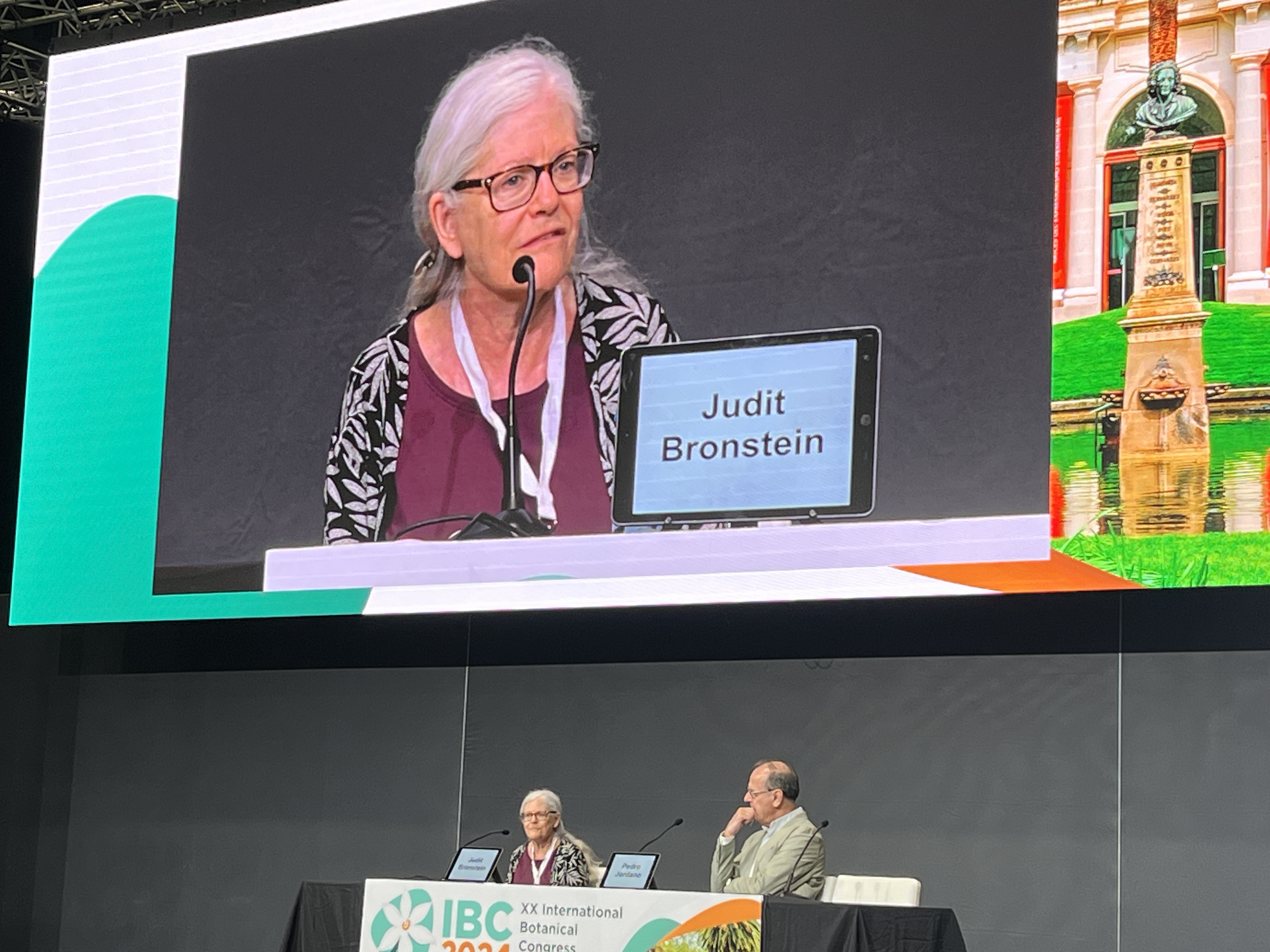
- Born: June 4, 1957 (age 69)
- Citizenship: United States
- Education: University of Michigan; Brown University
- Occupation: University Distinguished Professor
- Employer: University of Arizona

Judith Lee Bronstein is an American ecologist and evolutionary biologist who researches mutualisms, or positive species interactions. She has edited multiple books and volumes, including Mutualism, which was published by Oxford University Press in 2016.

== Education ==
Bronstein received a Bachelor of Arts from Brown University in 1979 as an independent major focused on the use of ecological theory in environmental policymaking. She received her Masters and Doctorate degrees in Ecology and Evolutionary Biology at the University of Michigan in 1986. Her doctoral dissertation research examined coevolution and constraints in a Neotropical fig-pollinator wasp mutualism.

Bronstein received additional training as a NATO Postdoctoral Fellow in Evolutionary Genetics at Centre Louis Emberger in Montpellier, France, in 1987. She then worked as an Isaak Walton Killam Postdoctoral Fellow in Evolutionary Ecology at the University of Alberta in 1988.

== Career ==
Since 2012 Judith Bronstein has been a University Distinguished Professor at the University of Arizona. She has worked in the Department of Ecology and Evolutionary Biology at University of Arizona since 1989, when she was hired as an assistant professor. Bronstein also worked as an adjunct professor at University of Miami from 1995 to 2010 and as a Visiting Professor at Duke University from 1999 to 2002, University of Puerto Rico in 1998, and University of Paris in 1989. In 2007-2008, Bronstein was a Program Director in the Division of Environmental Biology of the National Science Foundation.

Bronstein has served on a number of editorial boards for scientific journals, including as a Book Review Consultant for the Quarterly Review of Biology, as an editorial board member for Annual Review of Ecology, Evolution and Systematics, and as Editor in Chief for The American Naturalist.

Research in her Lab focuses on the ecology and evolution of mutualisms. She uses both field and laboratory experiments to examine topics including conflicts of interest in mutualisms, context-dependent outcomes in mutualisms and antagonisms, and the causes and consequences of "cheating" in mutualisms. Her research is both theoretical and empirical, and much of her recent studies have focused on exploitation in pollination mutualisms and variation in the outcomes of ant-plant protection mutualisms.

== Awards ==
- Elected Fellow of the American Academy of Arts and Sciences, 2024
- Elected Fellow of the Ecological Society of America, 2016
- Pillar of Excellence Award, University of Arizona Honors College, 2013
- Distinguished Service Award, National Science Foundation, 2008
- Distinguished Career Teaching Award, College of Science, University of Arizona, 2007
- Outstanding Faculty Award, Honors College, University of Arizona, 2006
- Mortar Board Senior Honor Society Hall of Fame Award, University of Arizona, 2003
- Distinguished Teaching Award, College of Science, University of Arizona, 2000

== Notable works ==
=== Books ===
- Mutualism (2016)

=== Papers ===
- Bronstein, J. L. (1994). "Conditional outcomes in mutualistic interactions". Trends in Ecology, Evolution, and Systematics. 9 (6): 214-217. doi:10.1016/0169-5347(94)90246-1.
- Bronstein, J. L. (1994). "Our current understanding of mutualism". The Quarterly Review of Biology. 69 (1): 31-51. doi:10.1086/418432.
- Chamberlain, S. A., Bronstein, J. L., and Rudgers, J. A. (2014). "How context dependent are species interactions?". Ecology Letters. 17 (7): 881-890. doi:10.1111/ele.12279.
