= Janis Antonovics =

UK-US academic biologist

Janis Antonovics FRS (Latvian: Jānis Antonovics; born 1942 in Riga, Reichskommissariat Ostland) is an American biologist, and Lewis and Clark Professor of Biology, at University of Virginia.

== Life ==
He was educated at Gravesend Grammar School (1953–1960), graduating from Clare College, Cambridge with a B.A. in 1963, and from University of Wales with a Ph.D. in 1966. He lectured at Institute for Advanced Study, Berlin.

== Honors ==
He is a 1991 Guggenheim Fellow. He was elected a Fellow of the Royal Society in 1988. He was elected to the American Academy of Arts and Sciences in 1992. He won the 1999 Sewall Wright Award.

== Publications ==
Antonovics is the author or co-author of well over 150 scientific publications and book chapters from the 1960s until the 2020s. These include:

- Antonovics, J. 2005. "Plant venereal diseases: insights from a messy metaphor". New Phytologist 165: 71–80.
- Antonovics, J., Hood, M. E., and Baker, C. H. 2006. "Was the 1918 flu avian in origin?" Nature 440: E9
- Antonovics, J., Abbate, J.L., Baker, C. H., Daley, D., Hood, M. E., Jenkins, C. E., Johnson, L. J., Murray, J. J., Panjeti, V., Volker H. W. Rudolf, V. W. H., Sloan, D., Vondrasek, J. 2007. "Evolution by any other name: antibiotic resistance and avoidance of the e-word". PLOS Biology 5: e30.
- Rudolf, V., and Antonovics, J. 2007. "Disease transmission by cannibalism: rare event or common occurrence?" Proceedings of the Royal Society of London, Series B 274:1205-10
- J Antonovics, AD Bradshaw, RG Turner (1971) Heavy metal tolerance in plants. Advances in ecological research 7 1-85
