= Behaviour (journal) =

- Discipline: Ethology
- Language: English
- Edited by: Mariska E. Kret and Brian Wisenden

Publication details
- History: 1948–present
- Publisher: Brill Publishers
- Frequency: 15/year
- Impact factor: 1.0 (2024)

Standard abbreviations
- ISO 4: Behaviour

Indexing
- CODEN: BEHAA8
- ISSN: 0005-7959 (print); 1568-539X (web)
- LCCN: 49029691
- OCLC no.: 44487265

Links
- Journal homepage

Behaviour is a double-blind peer-reviewed scientific journal covering all aspects of ethology. It is published by Brill Publishers and was established in 1948 by Niko Tinbergen and W.H. Thorpe. The editors-in-chief are Mariska E. Kret and Brian Wisenden.

== Abstracting and indexing ==
The journal is abstracted and indexed in:

- Aquatic Sciences & Fisheries Abstracts
- Biological Abstracts
- BIOSIS Previews
- Chemical Abstracts
- Current Contents/Agriculture, Biology & Environmental Sciences
- Current Contents/Life Sciences
- PsycINFO
- Psychological Abstracts
- Russian Academy of Sciences Bibliographies
- Science Citation Index
- Scopus
- The Zoological Record

According to the Journal Citation Reports, the journal has a 2020 impact factor of 1.991.
