= Sonia Altizer =

American ecologist and researcher

- Education: Duke University (B.S.); University of Minnesota (Ph.D.)
- Scientific career
- Fields: Ecology, Environment
- Workplaces: University of Georgia, Odum School of Ecology

Sonia M. Altizer (born 1970) is an American ecologist and professor at the University of Georgia Department of Entomology.

Her research includes work on animal migration, infectious disease dynamics, parasite transmission, urbanization, climate change, and butterflies. Altizer is a fellow of the Ecological Society of America and the American Association for the Advancement of Science. At the University of Georgia, she is a Distinguished Research Professor and Department Head of Entomology.

== Early life and education ==
Altizer was born as the daughter of Jim and Chris Altizer of Watkinsville, Georgia. She grew up in York, Pennsylvania. Her passion for biology and the natural world began when she received a gift of a microscope and a grow-your-own-butterflies kit on her twelfth birthday.

Altizer received a B.S. from Duke University in 1992 and a Ph.D. from the University of Minnesota in 1998. She also did a postdoctoral work at Princeton University and Cornell University.

== Career and research ==
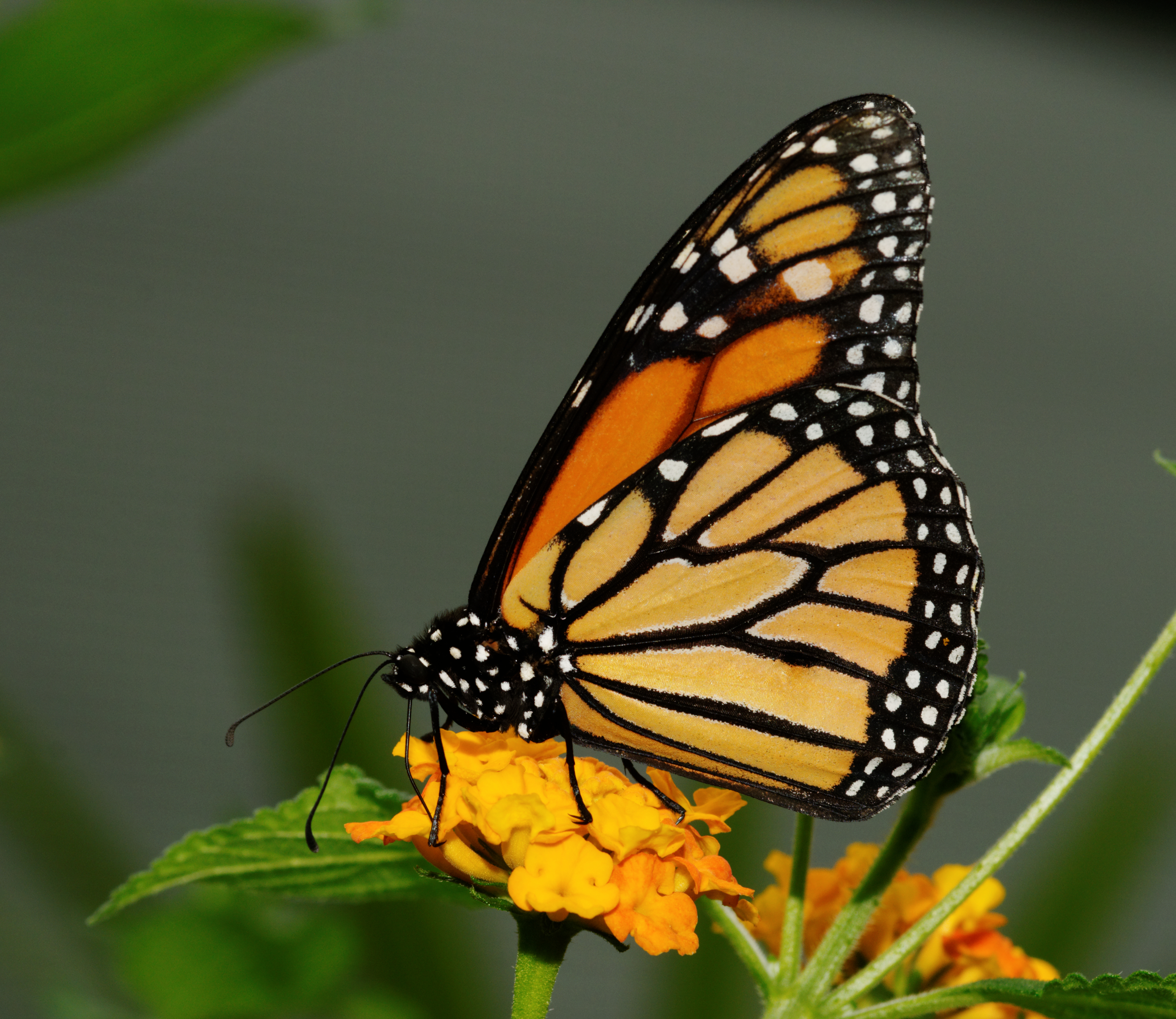
A monarch butterfly, the subject of some of Altizer's research

For 20 years since a graduate student of the University of Minnesota, Altizer traveled the world to study monarch butterfly migration, ecology, and interactions with a protozoan parasite. She has researched how seasonal migration of these butterflies affects parasite transmission, and also developed collaborative databases of mammalian infectious diseases, on host behavior, ecology, and life history interact with global-scale patterns of parasitism. She also focused her research on songbird-pathogen dynamics, including studies of house finch conjunctivitis, West Nile virus, and salmonellosis. Altizer has published several publications and she recently co-edited a book that would be published in 2015, titled Monarchs in a Changing World: Biology and Conservation of an Iconic Insect. She also and participated in high-level task forces dedicated to monarch butterfly conservation. A citizen science project called Monarch Health is run by her students at University of Georgia, which is now the eighth year. There are hundreds of volunteers across North America in sampling wild monarchs for a debilitating disease.

Altizer held a number of administrative positions in the Odum School of Ecology, including Associate Dean for Academic Affairs (2012-2017), Academic Coordinator (2017-2019), Promotion and Tenure Chair (2020), and Associate Dean for Research and Operations (2020-2021). Most recently, she served as Interim Dean for the Odum School (2021-2023).

=== Research areas ===
Altizer's research interests are ecology of infectious diseases in natural populations, evolution of host resistance and parasite virulence, insect ecology and evolution, animal migrations, and anthropogenic change and infectious disease dynamics.

== Honors and awards ==
- Odum School of Ecology Award for Teaching Excellence (2008)
- University of Georgia Award for Teaching Excellence (2008)
- Presidential Early Career Award for Scientists and Engineers (2008)
- Odum School of Ecology Faculty Instructor of the Year Award (2012)
- UGA Athletic Association Professor of Ecology (2014)
- Lothar Tresp Outstanding Honors Professor (2016)
- Lamar Dodd Creative Research Award (2018)
- Fellow, American Association for the Advancement of Science (2020)
- Fellow, Ecological Society of America (2024)

== Personal life ==
Altizer rides horses and has two children.

== Selected publications ==
- Rushmore J, Caillaud D, Hall RJ, Stumpf RM, Meyers LA, Altizer S (2014). "Network-based vaccination improves prospects for disease control in wild chimpanzees". Journal of the Royal Society Interface. 11 (97) 20140349. Bibcode:2014JRSI...1140349R. doi:10.1098/rsif.2014.0349. PMC 4208366. PMID 24872503.
- Altizer S, Ostfeld RS, Harvell CD, Johnson PT, Kutz S (2013). "Climate change and infectious disease: from evidence to a predictive framework". Science. 341 (6145): 514–519. Bibcode:2013Sci...341..514A. doi:10.1126/science.1239401. PMID 23908230.
- Rushmore J, Caillaud D, Matamba L, Stumpf RM, Borgatti SP, Altizer S (2013). "Social network analysis of wild chimpanzees with insights for infectious disease risk". Journal of Animal Ecology. 82 (5): 976–986. doi:10.1111/1365-2656.12088. PMID 23734782.
- Streicker DG, Recuenco S, Valderrama W, Gomez-Benavides J, Vargas I, Pacheco V, Condori RE, Montgomery J, Rupprecht CE, Rohani P, Altizer S (2012). "Ecological and anthropogenic drivers of rabies exposure in vampire bats: implications for transmission and control". Proceedings of the Royal Society B: Biological Sciences. 279 (1742): 3384–3392. Bibcode:2012PBioS.279.3384S. doi:10.1098/rspb.2012.0538. PMC 3396893. PMID 22696521.
- Altizer S, Han B, Bartel R (2011). "Animal migrations and infectious disease risk". Science. 331 (6015): 296–302. Bibcode:2011Sci...331..296A. doi:10.1126/science.1194694. PMID 21252339.
- Altizer S, Davis AK (2010). "Populations of monarch butterflies with different migratory behaviors show divergence in wing morphology". Evolution. 64 (4): 1018–1028. doi:10.1111/j.1558-5646.2010.00946.x. PMID 20067519.
- DeRoode JC, Altizer S (2010). "Host-parasite genetic interactions and virulence-transmission relationships in natural populations of monarch butterflies". Evolution. 64 (2): 502–514. Bibcode:2010Evolu..64..502D. doi:10.1111/j.1558-5646.2009.00845.x. PMID 19796153.
- Harvell CD, Altizer S, Cattadori I, Harrington L, Weil E (2009). "Climate change and wildlife diseases: when does the host matter the most?". Ecology. 90 (4): 912–920. Bibcode:2009Ecol...90..912H. doi:10.1890/08-0616.1. PMID 19449685.
- De Roode JC, Yates AJ, Altizer S (2008). "Virulence-transmission trade-offs and population divergence in virulence in a naturally-occurring butterfly parasite". PNAS. 105 (21): 7489–7494. Bibcode:2008PNAS..105.7489D. doi:10.1073/pnas.0710909105. PMC 2396697. PMID 18492806.
- Bradley CA, Gibbs SE, Altizer S (2008). "Urban land use predicts West Nile virus exposure in songbirds". Ecological Applications. 18 (5): 1083–1092. Bibcode:2008EcoAp..18.1083B. doi:10.1890/07-0822.1. PMID 18686573.
