= Montgomery Slatkin =

Biologist

Montgomery Wilson Slatkin
- Education: Harvard University (postgraduate); MIT (undergraduate)
- Awards: Sewall Wright Award (2000); Kimura Motoo Award (2016)
- Scientific career
- Workplaces: University of California, Berkeley; Santa Fe Institute; Harvard University; MIT; University of Chicago
- Thesis: Dispersal and Selection in Natural Populations (1970)
- Doctoral students: John Novembre
- Website: ib.berkeley.edu/labs/slatkin/monty/monty.html

Montgomery Wilson Slatkin is an American biologist, and professor at University of California, Berkeley.

== Education ==
Slatkin received his undergraduate degree in mathematics from Massachusetts Institute of Technology and his PhD from Harvard University.

== Research ==
Slatkin is faculty of the Slatkin Research Group, in the Center for Theoretical Evolutionary Genomics.

== Publications ==
Slatkin is the author of several books and scientific papers in peer-reviewed scientific journals.

== Awards ==
In 2000, Slatkin won the Sewall Wright Award and is on the Science Board of the Santa Fe Institute.
