= Evolution (journal) =

Monthly journal in the science of evolutionary biology

- Discipline: Evolutionary Biology
- Language: English
- Edited by: Jason Wolf

Publication details
- History: 1947–present
- Publisher: Oxford Academic for the Society for the Study of Evolution (United States)
- Frequency: Monthly
- Impact factor: 3.742 (2020)

Standard abbreviations
- ISO 4: Evolution

Indexing
- ISSN: 0014-3820 (print); 1558-5646 (web)
- JSTOR: 00143820

Links
- Journal homepage

Evolution: International Journal of Organic Evolution, is a monthly scientific journal that publishes significant new results of empirical or theoretical investigations concerning facts, processes, mechanics, or concepts of evolutionary phenomena and events. Evolution is published by Oxford Academic (formerly by Wiley) for the Society for the Study of Evolution. Its current editor-in-chief is Jason Wolf of the University of Bath, United Kingdom.

== Former editors-in-chief ==
The journal was founded soon after the Second World War. Its first editor was the systematic ornithologist Ernst Mayr.

- Ruth Geyer Shaw, July 2013 – 2017
- Daphne Fairbairn, 2010 – June 2013
