= Society for the Study of Evolution =

Professional organization of evolutionary biologists

The Society for the Study of Evolution is a professional organization of evolutionary biologists. It was formed in the United States in 1946 to promote the study of evolution and the integration of various fields of science concerned with evolution and to organize the publication of a scientific journal to report on relevant new research across a variety of fields.

The Society was established at a meeting in St. Louis on March 30, 1946. Fifty-seven scientists attended the meeting, which was chaired by Alfred E. Emerson. George Gaylord Simpson was elected as the Society's first President, with E. B. Babcock, Emerson, and J. T. Patterson as his Vice-presidents and Ernst Mayr as secretary. This society grew as an extension of the US National Research Council's Committee on Common Problems of Genetics and Paleontology (later renamed the Committee on Common Problems of Genetics, Paleontology and Systematics).

The first annual meeting of the society was held in Boston, December 28–31, 1946. A grant from the American Philosophical Society led to the publication of the journal Evolution.

Commonly known as the 'evolution meeting', the society's annual conference is often held together with the Society of Systematic Biologists and the American Society of Naturalists.

The society has an official journal Evolution. It was started in 1947 and is published by Oxford Academic (formerly by Wiley until January 2023). In 2017, it launched a second journal Evolution Letters.

== See also ==
- Evolutionary biology
