= American Society of Naturalists =

Professional society dedicated to the biological sciences

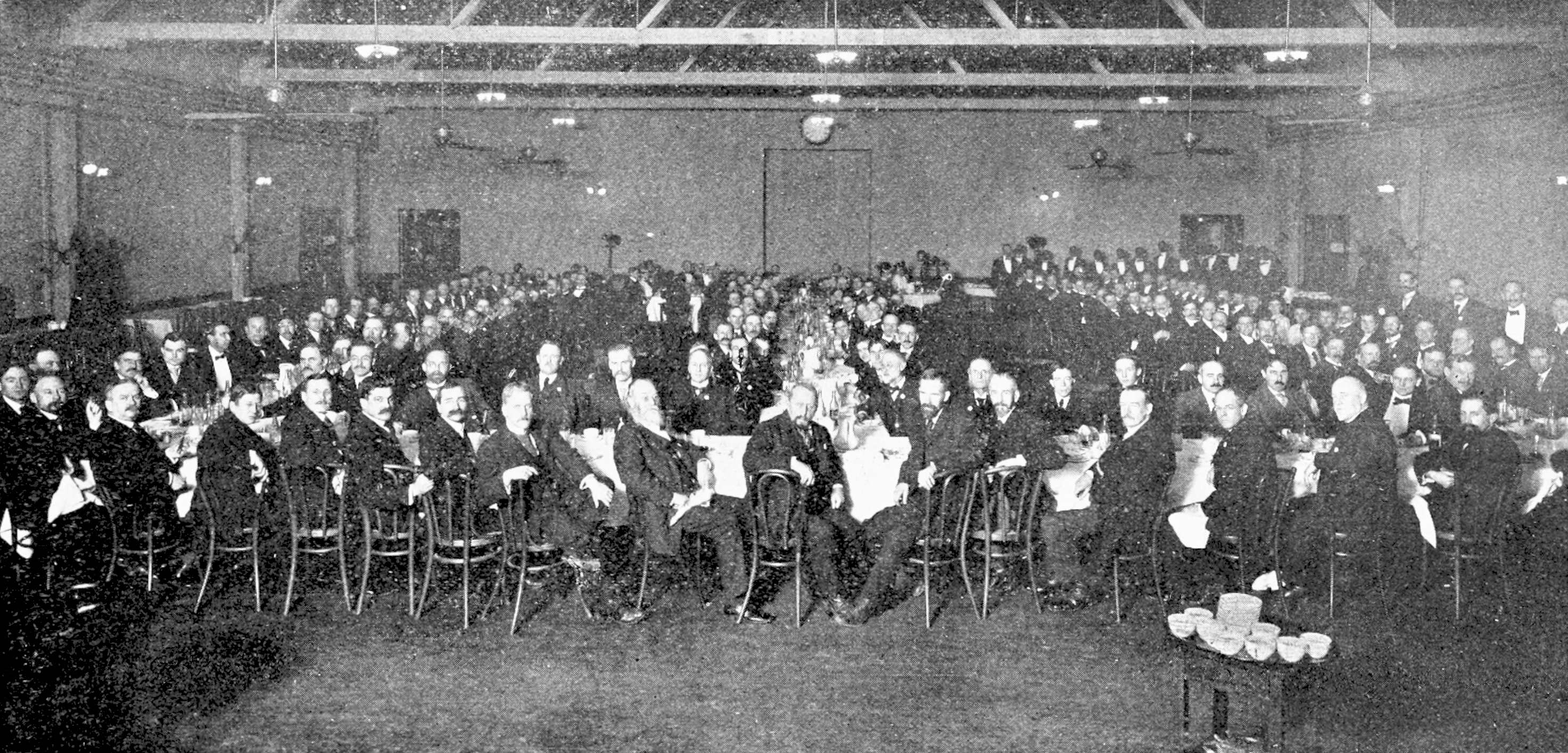
Dinner of the American Society of Naturalists

The American Society of Naturalists (ASN) was founded in 1883 and is one of the oldest professional societies dedicated to the biological sciences in North America. The purpose of the Society is "to advance and diffuse knowledge of organic evolution and other broad biological principles so as to enhance the conceptual unification of the biological sciences."

Founded in Massachusetts with Alpheus Spring Packard Jr. as its first president, it was called the Society of Naturalists of the Eastern United States until 1886.

== American Naturalist ==
Old cover of the journal American Naturalist

The scientific journal The American Naturalist is published on behalf of the society.

== Activities ==
The Society holds an annual meeting, commonly called 'Evolution', jointly with the Society for the Study of Evolution and Society of Systematic Biologists, with a scientific program of symposia and contributed papers and posters. It also confers a number of awards for achievement in evolutionary biology and/or ecology, including the Conceptual Unification Award (originally named in honor of Sewall Wright) for senior researchers making "fundamental contributions ... to the conceptual unification of the biological sciences", the Distinguished Naturalist award for "significant contributions" from naturalists in mid-career (originally named for E. O. Wilson), the Early Career Investigators Award for promising scientists early in their careers (originally named for Jasper Loftus-Hills), among other awards.

== Organization and officers ==
The current president and vice-president are Rebecca Fuller and Renée Duckworth respectively. Past presidents and vice-presidents include:

Presidents

- Alpheus Hyatt (1883–1884)
- Grove Karl Gilbert (1885–1886)
- Harrison Allen (1887–1888)
- George Lincoln Goodale (1889)
- H. Newell Martin (1890)
- William North Rice (1891)
- Henry Fairfield Osborn (1892)
- Russell Henry Chittenden (1893)
- Charles Sedgwick Minot (1894)
- Edward Drinker Cope (1895)
- William Berryman Scott (1896)
- Charles Otis Whitman (1897)
- Henry Pickering Bowditch (1898)
- William Gilson Farlow (1899)
- Edmund Beecher Wilson (1900)
- William T. Sedgwick (1901)
- James McKeen Cattell (1902)
- William Trelease (1903)
- Edward L. Mark (1904)
- Charles Davenport (1906)
- James P. McMurrich (1907)
- David P. Penhallow (1908)
- Thomas Hunt Morgan (1909)
- Daniel T. MacDougal (1910)
- Herbert Spencer Jennings (1911)
- Edwin Conklin (1912)
- Ross Granville Harrison (1913)
- Samuel F. Clarke (1914)
- Frank Rattray Lillie (1915)
- Raymond Pearl (1916)
- George Harrison Shull (1917)
- William E. Castle (1918)
- Edward Murray East (1919)
- Jacques Loeb (1920)
- Bradley M. Davis (1921)
- William H. Wheeler (1922)
- Rollins A. Emerson (1923)
- William Henry Howell (1924)
- Clinton Hart Merriam (1925)
- James Arthur Harris (1926)
- Clarence Erwin McClung (1927)
- Henry Herbert Donaldson (1928)
- George Howard Parker (1929)
- Albert Francis Blakeslee (1930)
- Samuel Jackson Holmes (1931)
- Ross Aiken Gortner (1932)
- Burton Edward Livingston (1933)
- Aaron Franklin Shull (1934)
- John Campbell Merriam (1935)
- Charles Elmer Allen (1936)
- David Hilt Tennent (1937)
- Robert Yerkes (1938)
- Ivey Foreman Lewis (1939)
- Joseph Hall Bodine (1940)
- William Walter Cort (1941)
- Ralph Erskine Cleland (1942)
- Hermann Joseph Muller (1943)
- Fay-Cooper Cole (1944)
- Edmund Ware Sinnott (1945)
- Charles W. Metz (1946)
- Karl Lashley (1947)
- Paul R. Burkholder (1948)
- Tracy Sonneborn (1949)
- Theodosius Dobzhansky (1950)
- Paul Christoph Mangelsdorf (1951)
- Sewall Wright (1952)
- Lewis Stadler (1953)
- Milislav Demerec (1954)
- Kenneth V. Thimann (1955)
- E. Newton Harvey (1956)
- G. Evelyn Hutchinson (1958)
- Paul Sears (1959)
- L. C. Dunn (1960)
- Marston Bates (1961)
- Ernst Mayr (1962)
- Royal Alexander Brink (1963)
- Albert Tyler (1964)
- H. Bentley Glass (1965)
- Reed C. Rollins (1966)
- Colin Pittendrigh (1967)
- Jack Shultz (1968)
- G. Ledyard Stebbins (1969)
- Bruce Wallace (1970)
- Harlan Lewis (1971)
- John Alexander Moore (1972)
- Hampton L. Carson (1973)
- Robert W. Allard (1974)
- Ruth Patrick (1975)
- Howard Levene (1976)
- Norman Giles (1977)
- Charles Duncan Michener (1978)
- Janice Spofford (1979)
- Robert Whittaker (1980)
- Elliot Spiess (1981)
- Richard Lewontin (1982)
- Peter H. Raven (1983)
- Robert R. Sokal (1984)
- Lawrence B. Slobodkin (1985)
- Janis Antonovics (1986)
- Wyatt Anderson (1987)
- Thomas Eisner (1988)
- David B. Wake (1989)
- Lee Ehrman (1990)
- James Brown (1991)
- Philip Hedrick (1992)
- Raymond B. Huey (1993)
- Douglas J. Futuyma (1994)
- Montgomery Slatkin (1995)
- Henry M. Wilbur (1996)
- Geerat J. Vermeij (1997)
- Robert K. Colwell (1998)
- Peter Grant (1999)
- Gary Allan Polis (2000)
- James Thomson (2001)
- Johanna Schmitt (2002)
- Daniel Simberloff (2003)
- Richard Grosberg (2004)
- Joseph Travis (2005)
- Mary Eleanor Power (2006)
- Robert Andrew Holt (2007)
- John N. Thompson (2008)
- Joel Kingsolver (2009)
- Jonathan Losos (2010)
- Robert Ricklefs (2011)
- Stevan J. Arnold (2012)
- Dolph Schluter (2013)
- Trevor Price (2014)
- Ellen Ketterson (2015)
- Mark McPeek (2016)
- Kathleen Donohue (2017)
- Sharon Y. Strauss (2018)
- Michael C. Whitlock (2019)
- Susan Kalisz (2020)
- Edmund D. Brodie III (2021)
- Judith Bronstein (2022)
- Maria Servedio (2023)
- Jeffrey K. Conner (2024)
- Daniel I. Bolnick (2025)

Vice-presidents

- Douglas Schemske (1999 and 2009)
- Susan Harrison (2006)
- Sarah P. (Sally) Otto (2008)
- Hopi Hoekstra (2012)
- Anurag Agrawal (2016)
