= McPeek =

McPeek is a surname. Notable people with the surname include:

- Ben McPeek (1934–1981), Canadian composer, conductor, and pianist
- Kenneth McPeek (born 1962), American Thoroughbred racehorse trainer
- Mark McPeek, American biologist

== See also ==
- McPeak
