= Susan Harrison (disambiguation) =

Susan Harrison was an American actress.

Susan Harrison may also refer to:

- Susan Harrison (British actress)
- Susie Frances Harrison, Canadian poet
- Susan Harrison (writer and artist)
- Susan Harrison (ecologist)

== See also ==
- Sue Harrison (disambiguation)
