= Spofford =

Spofford may refer to:

- Spofford, New Hampshire
  - Spofford Lake
- Spofford Juvenile Center, New York City
- Spofford, Texas
- Spofford (play), a 1967 play

== People with the surname ==
- Ainsworth Rand Spofford (1825–1908), Librarian of Congress, 1864–1897
- Charles Spofford (1902–1991), lawyer
- Edward Spofford, American professor of literature
- Harriet Elizabeth Prescott Spofford (1835–1921), American writer
- Henry M. Spofford (1821–1880), 19th-century Louisiana politician
- Janice Spofford (1925–2018), American biologist and geneticist
- Sally Hoyt Spofford (1914–2002), American ornithologist
- William B. Spofford (1921–2013), Episcopal bishop

== See also ==
- Otis Spofford, a children's novel
- Spafford (disambiguation)
- Spofforth, North Yorkshire, England, UK
  - Spofforth Castle
