= Hetty Cary =

American Confederate flag maker (1836–1892)

- Hetty Cary
- Born: Hetty Carr Cary; May 15, 1836; Baltimore, Maryland, US
- Died: September 27, 1892 (aged 56); Baltimore, Maryland, US
- Spouses: John Pegram (m. 1865; died 1865) H. Newell Martin (m. 1879)

Hetty Carr Cary (May 15, 1836 – September 27, 1892) was the wife of Confederate General John Pegram and, later, of pioneer physiologist H. Newell Martin. She is best remembered for making the first three battle flags of the Confederacy (along with her sister and cousin). Hetty was related to two of Virginia's most influential families, the Jeffersons (through her mother's family) and the Randolphs (through her paternal grandmother, Virginia Randolph Cary). She was also a lineal descendant of Pocahontas.

Henry Kyd Douglas, in I Rode With Stonewall, described Hetty as "the most beautiful woman of her day and generation" and "the handsomest woman in the Southland -- with her classic face, her pure complexion, her auburn hair. her perfect figure and her carriage, altogether the most beautiful woman I ever saw in any land."

== Civil War ==
Hetty was wholeheartedly a supporter of the South, even when in the North and among Union soldiers. On one occasion, she waved a smuggled Confederate flag from a second-story window as Federal troops marched through Baltimore. An officer of the passing regiment allegedly pointed Hetty out to his colonel, asking, "Shall I have her arrested?" The colonel looked at her and replied: "No, she is beautiful enough to do as she pleases."

=== Smuggling ===
Hetty and her sister Jennie smuggled drugs and clothing across the Potomac through the Union blockade for Confederate troops. They were forced to leave Baltimore after federal authorities discovered her Southern sympathies. They escaped to Richmond, where they then lived with their cousin Constance Cary and her mother, who served as the girls' chaperone. The three young ladies became known as the Cary Invincibles.

=== Making of the Confederate Battle Flag ===
Due to confusion among the troops during the First Battle of Bull Run due to the similar design and color of the Confederate flag, the Stars and Bars, and the Union flag, the Stars and Stripes, Confederate General P. G. T. Beauregard recommended that the Confederate flag be changed.

Constance Cary wrote:

During the autumn of '61, to my cousins, Hetty and Jennie, and to me was entrusted the making of the first three battle flags of the Confederacy. They were jaunty squares of scarlet crossed with dark blue edged in white, the cross bearing stars to indicate the number of the seceded states. We set our best stitches upon them, edged with gold fringed, and, when they were finished, dispatched one to General Joseph Johnston, another to General Pierre Beauregard, and the last to General Earl Van Dorn. The banners were made from red silk for the fields and blue silk for the crosses.

The resulting flag, commonly called the Southern Cross, served as the principal battle flag of the cavalry, infantry, and artillery units in the Army of Northern Virginia from November 1861 until the surrender at Appomattox Court House in April 1865.

=== Marriage to General John Pegram ===
When 26, Hetty met 32-year-old John Pegram at a party at his mother's home, and became engaged in 1862.

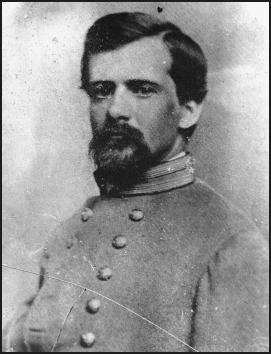
John Pegram

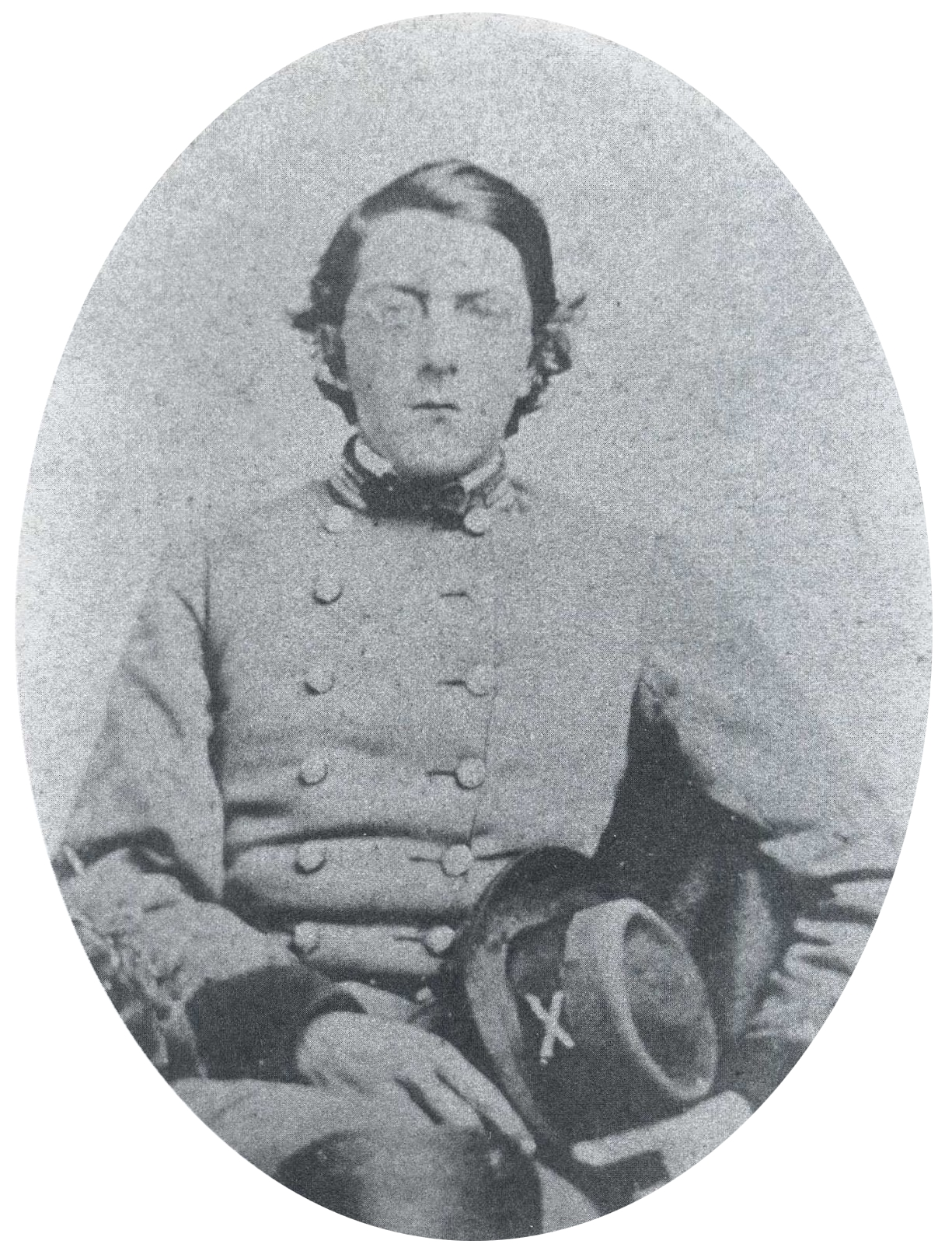
William Pegram

Their wedding date was finally set due to two events. At the end of 1864, John's division was sent to the Confederate entrenchments around Petersburg, Virginia. Near that same time, Hetty's mother, Mrs. Wilson Miles Cary of Baltimore, obtained a pass to go to Richmond to visit her two daughters. Due to her mother's visit, John urged Hetty not to delay their marriage any longer, and wedding preparations quickly began.

The wedding occurred January 19, 1865. It was a major social occasion, as it was the union of one of the most beautiful women in the South to one of Virginia's most eligible bachelors. The elite of Confederate society, including President Jefferson Davis and his wife Varina, attended the wedding in the historic St. Paul's Episcopal Church.

After the wedding, both John and Hetty traveled to a farmhouse near Petersburg, which was serving as General Pegram's headquarters. On February 6, only 18 days after their wedding, John was killed by a Minié ball leading a charge at the Battle of Hatcher's Run.

Hetty returned to Richmond on the train carrying her husband's body. Exactly three weeks after their wedding day, his coffin was taken to St. Paul's, the same church where the couple had been recently married. Reverend Charles Minnigerode, the pastor at their wedding, also conducted the funeral service.

On the day that her husband was killed, General Robert E. Lee was given command of all the armies of the Confederacy. He wrote the following sympathetic letter to Hetty:

I cannot find words to express my deep sympathy in your affliction, my sorrow at your loss. God alone can give you strength to bear the blow he has inflicted, and since it has been death by his hand I know it was sent in mercy. As dear as your husband was to you, as necessary apparently to his Country and as important to his friends, I feel assured it was best for him to go at the moment he did. His purity of character, his services to the Country and his devotion to his God, prepared him for the peace and rest he now enjoys. We are left to grieve at his departure, cherish his memory and prepare to follow. May God give us his Grace, that through the mediation of his blessed Son, we may be ready to obey his gracious Summons.

Truly and affectionately your friend
R E Lee

Petersburg 11 Feb '65

Only two months after her husband lost his life, her late husband's brother, Colonel William Pegram, was killed, dying during the fight at Five Forks in the Confederate retreat from Petersburg.

During a grieving period, Hetty stayed with her mother-in-law. Following that, Hetty and her mother returned to their home in Baltimore, where she taught at the Southern Home School for several years.

== Remarriage ==
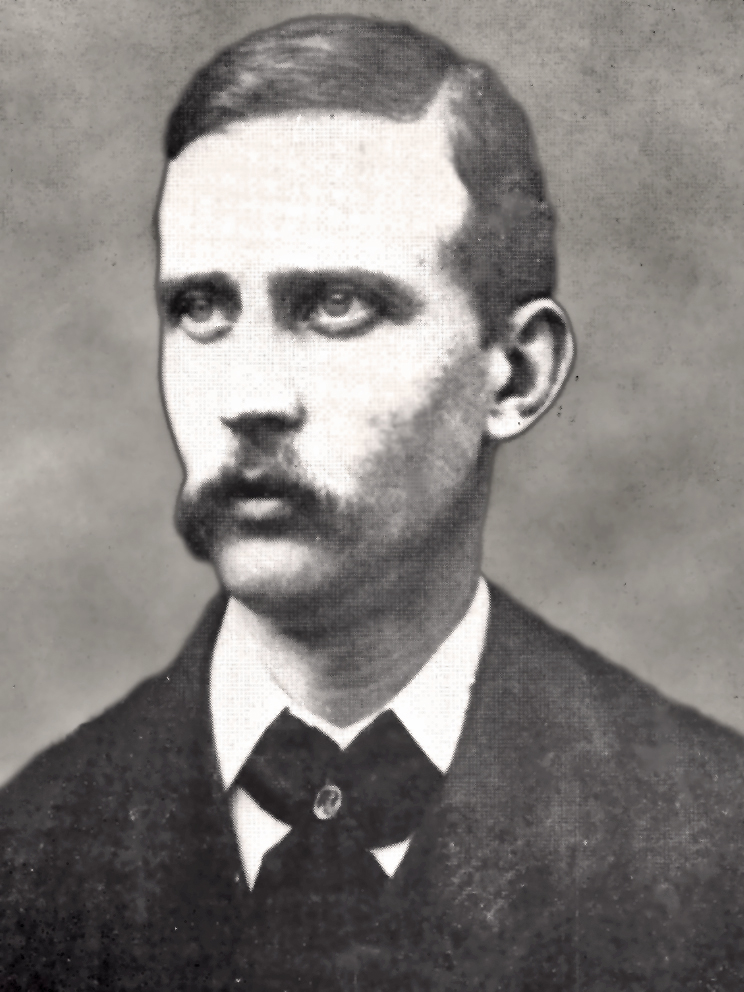
Henry Newell Martin

Later, while traveling abroad in Europe, Hetty met professor Henry Newell Martin, a pioneer physiologist and professor at Johns Hopkins University. They were married in 1879.

Hetty died at her home in Baltimore on September 27, 1892. She was buried there at St. Thomas' Churchyard.
