= Joseph Travis =

Joseph A. Travis
- Born: 1953 (age 72–73); Philadelphia, PA
- Other name: Joe
- Education: University of Pennsylvania, Duke University
- Scientific career
- Fields: Evolutionary biology, ecology, population genetics
- Workplaces: Florida State University
- Thesis: The ecological genetics of larval development in hylid frogs (1980)
- Doctoral advisor: Henry M. Wilbur
- Website: https://jtravislab.wixsite.com/travis-lab

Joseph A. Travis (born 1953) is an American Professor of Biological Science and past Dean of the College of Arts & Sciences at Florida State University.

His research studies the ecology of natural selection using experimental techniques. His studies focus on a number of specific problems ranging from the differences in inflorescence size among populations of the flypoison lily, Zigadenus (Amianthium) muscatoxicus in Virginia to the striking divergence in body size in north Florida populations of the sailfin molly, Poecilia latipinna. Populations of least killifish vary widely in density as well as in the form and amplitude of their fluctuations in population density, and in recent work Travis has identified which ecological factors are responsible for these differences in density regimes and what might be their cascading effects. He also is part of a large team of scientists, led by David Reznick of the University of California, Riverside, that is investigating how adaptation in Trinidadian guppies, Poecilia reticulata, alters how guppies interact with their predators and creates cascading effects on energy flow through the mountain stream ecosystem.

He received his A.B. from the University of Pennsylvania in 1975 and his Ph.D. from Duke University in 1980. He served as the Chair of the Department of Biological Science at Florida State University (FSU) from 1991 to 1997, after which he served as Dean of FSU's College of Arts and Sciences from 2005 to 2011. He is a fellow of the American Association for the Advancement of Science and was elected vice-president of the American Society of Naturalists in 1992. He then served as President of the American Society of Naturalists in 2005, in addition to serving as President of the American Institute of Biological Sciences in 2010 and 2012.

He has won many awards for both research and teaching. In 1984 FSU awarded him the Developing Scholar Award, and in 1992 he was given the University Teaching Award. The university honored him again in 1996, awarding him the Robert O. Lawton Distinguished Professor award, the highest honor faculty can bestow upon one another at the university. In 2007, he was awarded the gold medal by the Tallahassee Scientific Society, which is awarded to a scientist or scholar who has outstanding achievements in both science or science education and science outreach. In 2011 he won the E. O. Wilson Naturalist Award from the American Society of Naturalists. The award "is given to an active investigator in mid-career who has made significant contributions to the knowledge of a particular ecosystem or group of organisms."

Along with colleague Michael Ruse he is co-editor of Evolution: The First Four Billion Years (Belknap Press of Harvard University Press 2009, ISBN 978-0-674-03175-3).
