= H. Newell Martin =

British physiologist

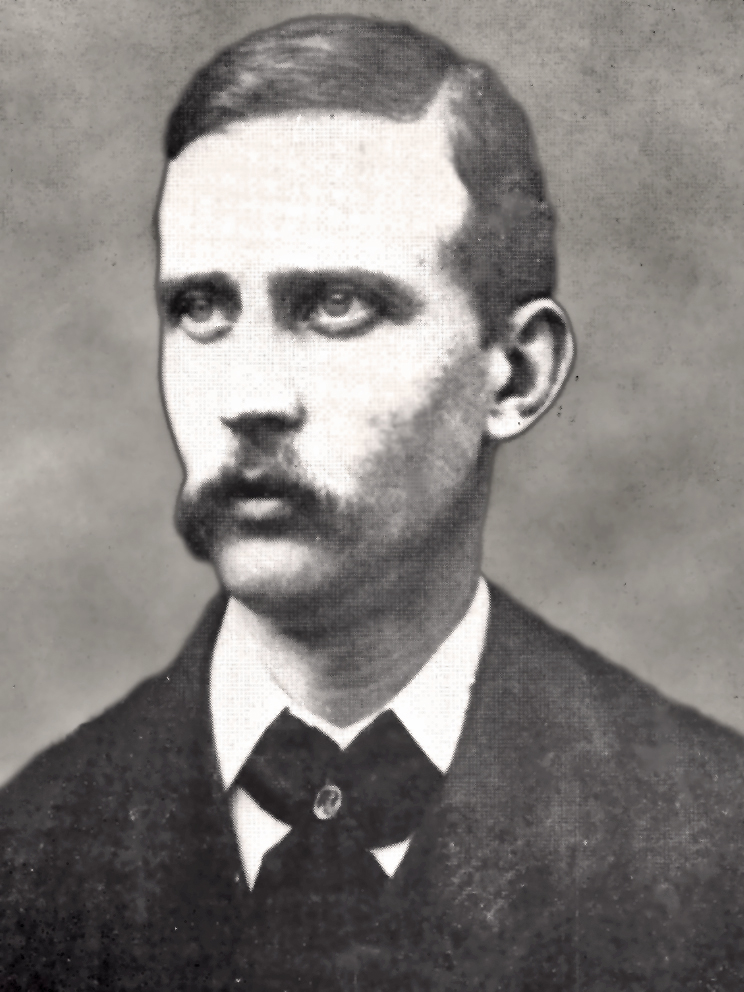
H. Newell Martin

Henry Newell Martin, FRS (1 July 1848 – 27 October 1896) was a British physiologist and vivisection activist.

== Biography ==
He was born in Newry, County Down, the son of Henry Martin, a Congregational minister. He was educated at University College, London and Christ's College, Cambridge, where he matriculated in 1870, took the Part I Natural Sciences in 1873, and graduated B.A. in 1874. At the University of London, where he had graduated B.Sc. in 1870, he went on to become M.B. in 1871, and D.Sc. in 1872.

Martin worked as demonstrator to Michael Foster of Trinity College from 1870 to 1876; and was a Fellow of Christ's College for five years from 1874. Daniel Coit Gilman of Johns Hopkins University, on advice from Foster and Thomas Huxley, hired Martin in 1876 and set up the university's Biology Department around him.

Martin was appointed to the university's first professorship of physiology, one of the first five full professors appointed to the Hopkins faculty. It was understood that he would be laying the foundation for a medical school: Johns Hopkins School of Medicine eventually opened in 1893.

Having delivered the Croonian Lecture in 1883 on "The Direct Influence of Gradual Variations of Temperature upon the Rate of Beat of the Dog's Heart", Martin was elected a Fellow of the Royal Society in 1885. Martin served as the president of the American Society of Naturalists in 1890.

Martin's scientific career was curtailed around 1893, by alcoholism. He died on 27 October 1896 in Burley-in-Wharfedale, Yorkshire.

== Work ==
Martin developed the first isolated mammalian heart lung preparation (described in 1881), which Ernest Henry Starling later used. He collaborated with George Nuttall, at Baltimore for a year around 1885. With the hiring of William Keith Brooks came the opening of the Chesapeake Zoological Laboratory. It conducted its work at stations from Beaufort, North Carolina, to the Bahamas, studying marine life and interdependencies between species.

== Views ==
Martin represented and spread the views of the Cambridge school of physiology around Michael Foster, which took account in a basic way of the theory of evolution. He co-wrote A Course of Practical Instruction in Elementary Biology (1875) with Thomas Huxley, a leading proponent of evolution. It was based on Huxley's annual summer course, given since 1871, of laboratory teaching for future science teachers; and concentrated on a small number of types of plants and animals.

Biology labs were under attack by those opposed to experiments on live animals, a procedure known as vivisection. Martin defended vivisection, stating "Physiology is concerned with the phenomena going on in living things, and vital processes cannot be observed in dead bodies." He invited visitors to his lab to observe experiments.

== Selected publications ==
- Martin, H. Newell (November 1873). "The structure of the olfactory mucous membrane". Journal of Anatomy and Physiology. 8 (Pt 1): 39–44.1. PMC 1318999. PMID 17231007.
- Huxley, T.H.; Martin, H.N. (1875). A course of practical instruction in elementary biology. London, UK: Macmillan and Co. p. 290.
- Martin, H. Newell (January 1877). "The study and teaching of biology". Popular Science Monthly. 10: 298–309.
  Introductory lecture, 23 October 1876.
- Martin, H. Newell (1879). "The normal respiratory movements of the frog, and the influence upon its respiratory centre of stimulation of the optic lobes". Stud Biol Lab Johns Hopkins University (1).
- Martin, H. Newell (1881). The human body, an account of its structure and activities and the conditions of its healthy working. New York: Henry Holt and Co.
- Martin, H. Newell (1881). "A new method of studying the mammalian heart". Stud Biol Lab Johns Hopkins University (2): 119–130.
- Martin, H.N.; Moale, WA (1881). A handbook of vertebrate dissection. New York: Macmillan and Co.
- Martin, H. Newell (1882). "Observations on the direct influence of variations of arterial pressure upon the rate of beat of the mammalian heart". Stud Biol Lab Johns Hopkins University. 2: 213–233.
- Martin, H. Newell (1883). "The direct influence of gradual variations of temperature upon the rate of beat of the dog's heart". Philosophical Transactions of the Royal Society. 174: 663–688. doi:10.1098/rstl.1883.0021. hdl:2027/nnc2.ark:/13960/t7pn9td9j. S2CID 110481064.
- Martin, H. Newell; Stevens, Lewis T. (1883). "The action of ethyl alcohol upon the dog's heart". Stud Biol Lab Johns Hopkins University: 477–494.
- Martin, H. Newell (1885). A correction of certain statements published in the 'Zoophilist' also A castigation and an appeal. Baltimore, MD. p. 11.
- Martin, H. Newell (1884). The human body. A beginner's text-book of anatomy, physiology and hygiene. New York: Henry Holt and Co.
  Various co-authors (including his wife for the 1st edition).10th edition online.
- Martin, H. Newell (1891). "Effects of bleeding and starvation upon the proteids of the blood". Medical Record. 40: 365–366.
  Quoted by Fye.
- Martin, H. Newell (1895). Physiological papers. Baltimore, MD: The Johns Hopkins Press. pp. 264.
  Collected articles.

== Personal life ==
In 1879, Martin married Hetty Cary, widow of Confederate General John Pegram.
