= Christopher K. W. Tam =

American mathematician

Christopher K. W. Tam is an American mathematician, currently the Robert O. Lawton Distinguished Professor at Florida State University.
