= Maria Servedio =

Canadian-American professor

Maria R. Servedio is a Canadian-American professor at the University of North Carolina at Chapel Hill. Her research spans a wide range of topics in evolutionary biology from sexual selection to evolution of behavior. She largely approaches these topics using mathematical models. Her current research interests include speciation and reinforcement, mate choice, and learning with a particular focus on evolutionary mechanisms that promote premating (prezygotic) isolation. Through integrative approaches and collaborations, she uses mathematical models along with experimental, genetic, and comparative techniques to draw conclusions on how evolution occurs. She has published extensively on these topics and has more than 50 peer-reviewed articles. She served as Vice President in 2018 of the American Society of Naturalists, and has been elected to serve as President in 2023.

== Early life and education ==
Servedio attended Harvard University from 1989 to 1993. While there she received several awards for academic achievement including the Elizabeth Cary Agassiz Certificate of Merit and the John Harvard Scholarship. After completing her A.B., she went to the University of Texas at Austin to do a PhD under the tutelage of Mark Kirkpatrick. Her dissertation was titled "Preferences, signals and evolution: theoretical studies of mate choice copying, reinforcement, and aposematic coloration." Following that, she did a few postdoctoral positions at Cornell University, University of California, Davis, and University of California, San Diego before taking a position at the University of North Carolina at Chapel Hill in 2002 where she has progressed to full professor in the Department of Biology.

== Research and service ==
Servedio has focused understanding how mechanisms that prevent different species from interbreeding from mating with one another through a theoretical framework coupled with experimental evidence. Most of her research involved constructing mathematical models to better understand prezygotic isolation. Another topic she has focused on is why males choose mates, and she has found conditions in which females can have traits which are favored by males and that preference for those traits can persist, suggesting that both are adaptive.

She served as Vice President of the American Society of Naturalists in 2018 as well as serving as handling editor for Evolution since 2015. Through her career, she has acted in editorial capacity for a number of other journals including Current Zoology, PeerJ, Behavioral Ecology, Quarterly Review of Biology, and The American Naturalist. Further, she has reviewed articles for over 25 journals and acted as a reviewer for 9 different granting agencies, including the National Science Foundation and National Institutes of Health. She currently has one graduate student and has trained 5 others as well as 8 postdoctoral fellows. She has extensive experience teaching courses largely focusing on using mathematical modeling in biology.

=== Career ===
- 2002–present: Full Professor, University of North Carolina at Chapel Hill
- 2001-2002: Postdoctoral Fellow, University of California, San Diego
- 1999-2001: Postdoctoral Fellow, University of California, Davis
- 1998-1999: Postdoctoral Fellow, Cornell University
- 1993-1998: PhD Student, University of Texas, Austin
- 1989-1993: Undergraduate Student, Harvard University

== Awards and honors ==
- 2018: Vice President, American Society of Naturalists
- 2017: Fellow, Swedish Collegium for Advanced Study
- 2010-2012: Council Member, Society for the Study of Evolution
- 2000: Young Investigators Award, American Society of Naturalists
- 1992: John Harvard Scholarship and Elizabeth Cary Agassiz Scholarship (highest academic achievement), Harvard College
- 1990 and 1991: Elizabeth Cary Agassiz Certificate of Merit (high academic achievement), Harvard College

== Select publications ==
Servedio has an extensive history of publishing on topics in evolutionary biology. Below are some select articles on which she has been an author:

- Servedio, M.R. and M.A.F. Noor. 2003. The role of reinforcement in speciation: theory and data meet. Annual Review of Ecology and Systematics 34:339-364.
- Servedio, M.R., G.S. van Doorn, M. Kopp, A.M. Frame and P. Nosil. 2011. Magic traits in speciation: ‘magic’ but not rare? Trends in Ecology and Evolution 26: 389-397.
- Wiens, J.J. and M.R. Servedio. 2000. Species delimitation in systematics: inferring "fixed" diagnostic differences between species. Proceedings of the Royal Society of London Series B. 267(1444):631-636.
- Verzijden, M.N., C. ten Cate, M.R. Servedio, G. Kozak, J.W. Boughman, and E.I. Svensson. 2013. The impact of learned mating traits on speciation is not yet clear. Response to Kawecki. Trends in Ecology and Evolution 28:69-70.
- Sæther, S.A., G.-P. Sætre, T. Borge, C. Wiley, N. Svedin, G. Andersson, T. Veen, J. Haavie, M.R. Servedio, S. Bureš, M. Král, M.B. Hjernquist, L. Gustafsson, J. Träff and A. Qvarnström. 2007. Sex chromosome-linked species recognition and evolution of reproductive isolation in flycatchers. Science 318:95-97.
- Servedio, M.R. and M. Kirkpatrick. 1997. The effects of gene flow on reinforcement. Evolution 51:1764-1772.
- Servedio, M.R. 2000. Reinforcement and the genetics of nonrandom mating. Evolution. 54:21-29.
- Lachlan, R.F. and M.R. Servedio. 2004. Song learning accelerates allopatric speciation. Evolution 58:2049-2063.
- Servedio, M.R. 2001. Beyond reinforcement: the evolution of premating isolation by direct selection on preferences and postmating, prezygotic incompatibilities. Evolution 55:1909-1920.
- Servedio, M.R. and R. Lande. 2006. Population genetic models of male and mutual mate choice. Evolution 60:674-685.
