= Amy Angert =

American evolutionary biologist

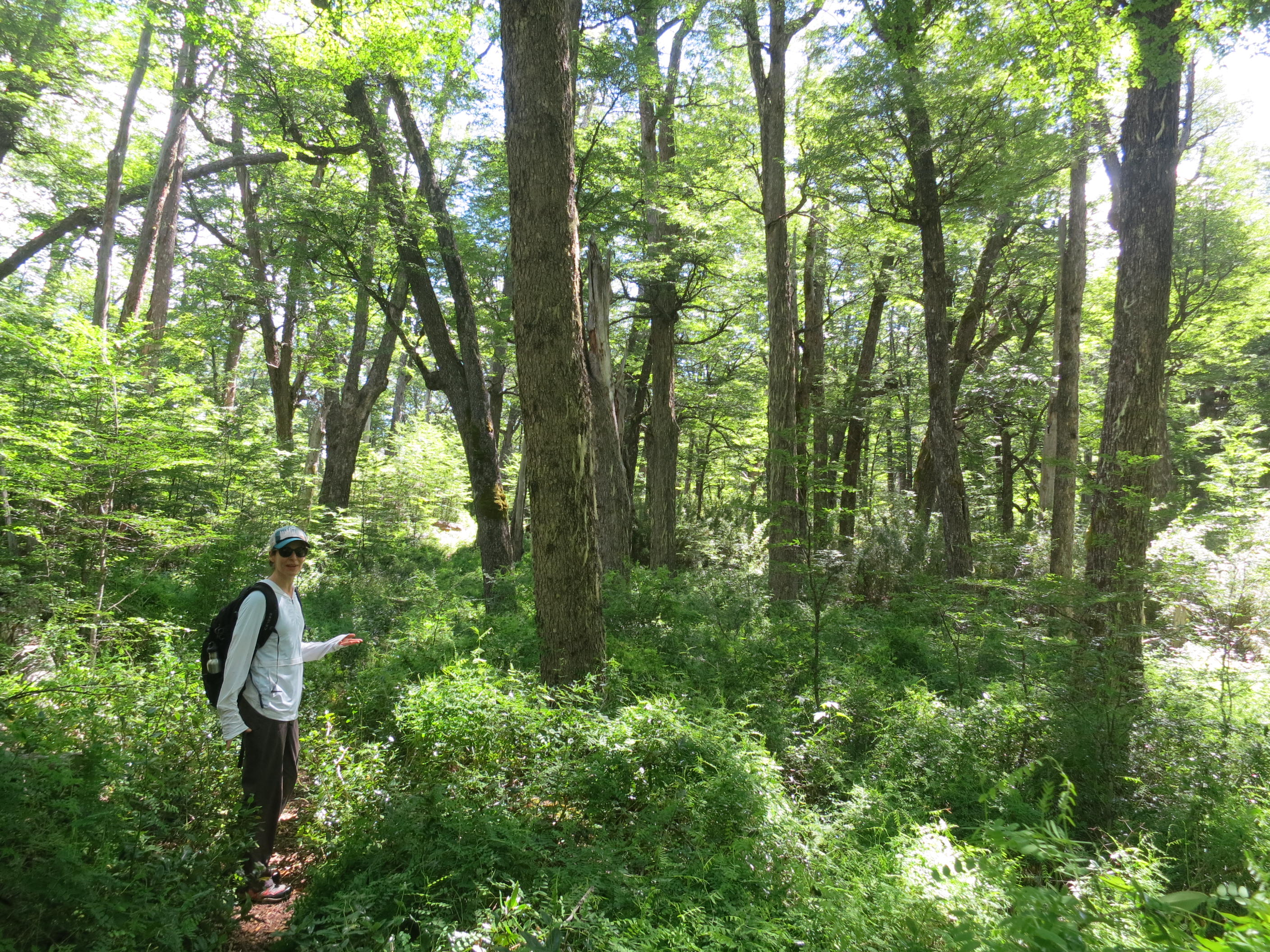
Angert in 2018

Professor Amy Angert is a population ecologist and evolutionary ecologist, working in the Botany and Zoology departments and Biodiversity Research Centre at the University of British Columbia. Her research is known for pioneering experimental approaches to study species geographic distributions.

== Research ==
Angert co-authored one of the most influential reviews of the ecological and evolutionary mechanisms that limit species geographic ranges. Her synthesis of climate-driven range shifts highlighted the difficulty in predicting which species will be able to track climate change.

She has pioneered creative experimental approaches to studying range limits. She was the first to use experimental evolution to test evolutionary mechanisms for species range limits in the field, showing that adaptive trade-offs could limit evolution at range edges. Experiments with Seema Sheth showed that range-edge populations can harbour substantial adaptive variation and responded to artificial selection. Much of her work involves plant in the genus Mimulus as ecological and evolutionary models.

== Career ==
Angert did her PhD with evolutionary biologist Doug Schemske at the University of Washington and Michigan State University. She was hired as a professor of biology at Colorado State University in 2008, and moved to the University of British Columbia in 2012. She won a Tier 2 Canada Research Chair which was renewed for a second term. In 2023 she was elected vice-president to the American Society of Naturalists. In 2025, she was elected to the American Academy of Arts and Sciences.
