= 20th Virginia Infantry Regiment =

- Flag of Virginia, 1861
- Active: July 1861 – September 1861
- Disbanded: September 1861
- Country: Confederacy
- Allegiance: Confederate States of America
- Branch: Confederate States Army
- Type: Infantry
- Engagements: American Civil War: Battle of Rich Mountain

Commanders
- Notable commanders: Lt. Colonel John Pegram

|

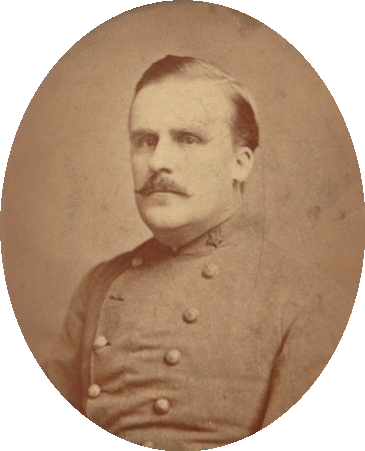
Maj. Thomas A. Brander, of the 20th Virginia Infantry

The 20th Virginia Infantry Regiment was an infantry regiment raised in Virginia for service in the Confederate States Army during the American Civil War. It fought mostly with the Army of Northern Virginia.

The 20th Virginia was assembled in July, 1861, with men from Richmond and the counties of Lunenburg, Powhatan, Buckingham, Prince Edward, Halifax, and Brunswick. The college unit The "Hampden-Sydney Boys" served from that institution. Two companies were captured in the fight at Rich Mountain and in September five companies were disbanded.

An unsuccessful attempt was made to reorganize, and later the two companies were assigned to the 59th Virginia Infantry.

Lieutenant Colonels James R. Crenshaw, John Pegram, and Nathaniel Tyler were in command.

Recruitment Areas of the 20th Virginia Infantry Regiment
Company	Nickname	Recruitment Area
A	The Virginia Guard	Richmond County
B	Pryor Rifle Company	Lunenburg County
C	Flat Rock Riflemen, or Loch Leven Rangers	Lunenburg County
D	Powhatan Rifles	Powhatan County
E	Lee Guards	Buckingham County
F	Jeff Davis Guard, or Buckingham Institute Guard	Buckingham County
G	Hampden-Sydney Boys	Prince Edward County
H	Clover Rifles	Halifax County
I	Brunswick Blues	Brunswick County
K	South of Dan Rebels	Halifax County

== In popular culture ==
In the science fiction short story, Field Test by Keith Laumer, a newly designed and built Bolo Mark XX Model B is assigned to "the 20th Virginia, a regiment ancient and honorable, with a history dating back to Terra Insula".

== See also ==
- List of Virginia Civil War units
