= Janice Spofford =

American biologist and geneticist (1925–2018)

- Born: Janice Brogue; 1925
- Died: 2018 (aged 92–93); Chicago, US
- Education: University of Chicago (PhB, SB, PhD)
- Scientific career
- Fields: Evolutionary biology, genetics
- Workplaces: University of Chicago

Janice B. Spofford (November 1925 – March 2018) was an American evolutionary biologist and geneticist who taught at the University of Chicago for decades starting in 1949, retiring at the rank of associate professor emeritus in the Department of Ecology and Evolution. She served as president of the American Society of Naturalists in 1979.

== Life and career ==
Spofford was born Janice Brogue on November 14, 1925, in Chicago, Illinois, where she would live her entire life except for a brief residency in Mason City, Iowa, as a child. She graduated from Hyde Park High School and received a scholarship to attend the University of Chicago by earning the top score in a statewide Latin competition. She received her PhB in 1944, SB in 1946, and PhD in 1955, all from the University of Chicago. Her dissertation as submitted to the Department in Zoology was "The Relation between Expressivity and Selection against Eyeless in Drosophila Malanogaster."

In 1949 at age 23, Spofford began teaching biology at UChicago, where she was the university's youngest faculty member. She spent her entire academic career at UChicago, researching topics such as fruit fly genetics (Drosophila melanogaster) and the phenomenon of heterosis. She served as an associate member of UChicago's Committee on Evolutionary Biology and the Committee on Genetics, Genomics, and Systems Biology. She retired at the rank of associate professor emeritus in the Department of Ecology and Evolution. She served as president of the American Society of Naturalists in 1979 after serving as secretary from 1971 to 1973. Spofford published research and review articles in The American Naturalist, Genetics, Proceedings of the National Academy of Sciences, Genetics Research, Developmental Biology, Heredity, Science, Brookhaven Symposia in Biology, and other scientific journals.

She was married to Richardson L. Spofford, an accountant. They had two sons. She died in late March 2018 at the age of 92.
