= Charles Elmer Allen =

American botanist and cell biologist

Charles Elmer Allen (October 4, 1872 in Horicon, Wisconsin – June 25, 1954) was an American botanist and cell biologist whose discoveries include the first documentation of sex chromosomes in plants. He was a member of the United States National Academy of Sciences and the American Philosophical Society, and held presidencies of the Botanical Society of America (1921), the Wisconsin Academy of Sciences, Arts and Letters (1931-1933), the American Society of Naturalists (1936), and the American Microscopical Society (1948). Allen was a professor at the University of Wisconsin for over 20 years.
