= Lee Ehrman =

American geneticist

- Born: 1935 (age 90–91)
- Citizenship: American
- Education: Queens College (BS); Columbia University (MS, PhD)
- Known for: Behavior genetics
- Spouse: Richard Guy Ehrman (m. 1955–2007)
- Awards: Behavior Genetics Association's Dobzhansky Award (1988)
- Scientific career
- Fields: Genetics
- Institutions: State University of New York at Purchase
- Thesis: The Genetics of Hybrid Sterility in Drosophila Paulistorum (1959)
- Academic advisors: Theodosius Dobzhansky

Lee Ehrman (born 1935) is an American geneticist and a distinguished professor of biology at State University of New York at Purchase known for her research on Drosophila fruit flies.

== Early life and education ==
Ehrman earned a Bachelor of Science from Queens College of CUNY in 1956. Ehrman earned her M.S. in 1957 and received her Ph.D. from Columbia University in 1959, where she studied under Theodosius Dobzhansky. She joined the faculty at Purchase as a founding faculty member in 1970. In 1976, she received Purchase's Chancellor‘s Award for Excellence in Teaching, and she was named a Distinguished Professor of Biology there in 1995.

== Career ==
Ehrman is a founding faculty member of Purchase College, where she has been teaching since 1970.

== Awards and honors ==
Ehrman was elected a fellow of the American Association for the Advancement of Science in 1973. In 1976 she received the Chancellor's Award for Excellence in Teaching. She was president of the Behavior Genetics Association in 1978 and of the American Society of Naturalists in 1990. In 1988, she received the Behavior Genetics Association's Dobzhansky Award. In 1989, she received an honorary Doctor of Science from the City University of New York. She is a member of the American Association of University Women. She received the rank of Distinguished Professor in 1995 from the State University Board of Trustees.
