= Philip Hedrick =

American geneticist and biologist (born 1942)

- Born: Philip W. Hedrick; November 21, 1942 (age 83); Swampscott, Massachusetts, U.S.
- Education: Hanover College; University of Minnesota
- Scientific career
- Fields: Population genetics; Conservation genetics; Conservation biology
- Workplaces: University of Kansas; Pennsylvania State University; Arizona State University
- Thesis: Selection in finite populations (1969)
- Doctoral advisor: R. E. Comstock
- Website: https://sols.asu.edu/philip-hedrick

Philip W. Hedrick (born November 21, 1942) is an American emeritus professor at Arizona State University (ASU). From 1992 until his retirement, Hedrick was Ullman Professor of Conservation Biology at ASU. Hedrick has published over 200 articles on the topics of population genetics and conservation biology. Among other organisms, he has published extensively on wolves and bighorn sheep.

Hedrick previously served as president of the American Society of Naturalists and the American Genetic Association, and in 1987 was made a fellow of the American Association for the Advancement of Science.

== Selected publications ==
- Genetics of Populations (4th ed). 2011. Jones and Bartlett Publishers: Sudbury, Mass. ISBN 978-0763757373
