= Sue Harrison =

Sue Harrison may refer to:

- Sue Harrison (author), writer of the Ivory Carver Trilogy
- Sue Harrison (athlete) (born 1971), British long-distance athlete

== See also ==
- Susan Harrison (disambiguation)
