= David Hilt Tennent =

American embryologist and developmental biologist

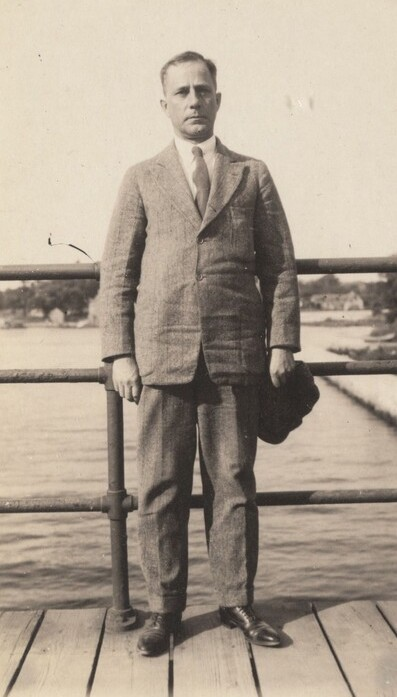
Tennent in 1921 at the Marine Biological Laboratory

David Hilt Tennent (28 May 1873 – 14 January 1941) was an American biologist and professor at the Bryn Mawr College. He was a specialist on cytology and embryology, particularly based on fertilization studies of echinoderms and made numerous studies on hybridization; and the control on expression of maternal and paternal genes.

== Early life and education ==
Tennent was born in Janesville, Wisconsin, to Thomas, a contractor of Irish ancestry, and his second wife Mary from Philadelphia. Tennent was the fourth child from the second marriage and grew up in a large family with several children from his father's first marriage. He sought to study medicine but the death of his father in 1893 following an accident forced him to work as a clerk in a pharmacy during spare-time. He taught himself and passed the Wisconsin State Examination in Pharmacy and in 1895 he was supported by an older sister to study at the Olivet College, Michigan. He graduated in 1900, training in the last years under Hubert Lyman Clark who persuaded him to apply to Johns Hopkins. Receiving an assistantship, he studied under William Keith Brooks and Ethan Allen Andrews, and received a doctorate in 1904 with a dissertation titled "A study of the life-history of Bucephalus haimeanus: a parasite of the oyster".

== Career ==
He taught briefly at Randolph Macon College. He worked at various marine research stations around the world including Woods Hole, Torres Strait, and Tokyo. In 1923, he had deposited his notes in a bank vault and travelled to China but the notes were destroyed in an earthquake. He conducted experiments on inter-specific hybridization of echinoderms and observed the fate of male and female chromatin in crosses. He was elected to the United States National Academy of Sciences in 1929 and the American Philosophical Society in 1938.

== Personal life ==
Tennent married Esther Margaret Maddux in 1909. They had a son who became a biochemist.
