= Douglas Schemske =

American evolutionary ecologist (born 1948)

Douglas Schemske is an American evolutionary ecologist who made major contributions to research on pollination, the latitudinal gradient in species diversity, the evolution of polyploidy, and plant mating systems.

== Career ==
Doug Schemske received his Ph.D. in ecology and evolution from the University of Illinois in 1977 and was a postdoctoral fellow at the Smithsonian Tropical Research Institute in Panama. He held academic positions at Amherst College, the University of Chicago and the University of Washington, prior to joining Michigan State University in 2001, where he worked for the rest of his career. He was elected vice president of the American Society of Naturalists in 2009.

== Research ==
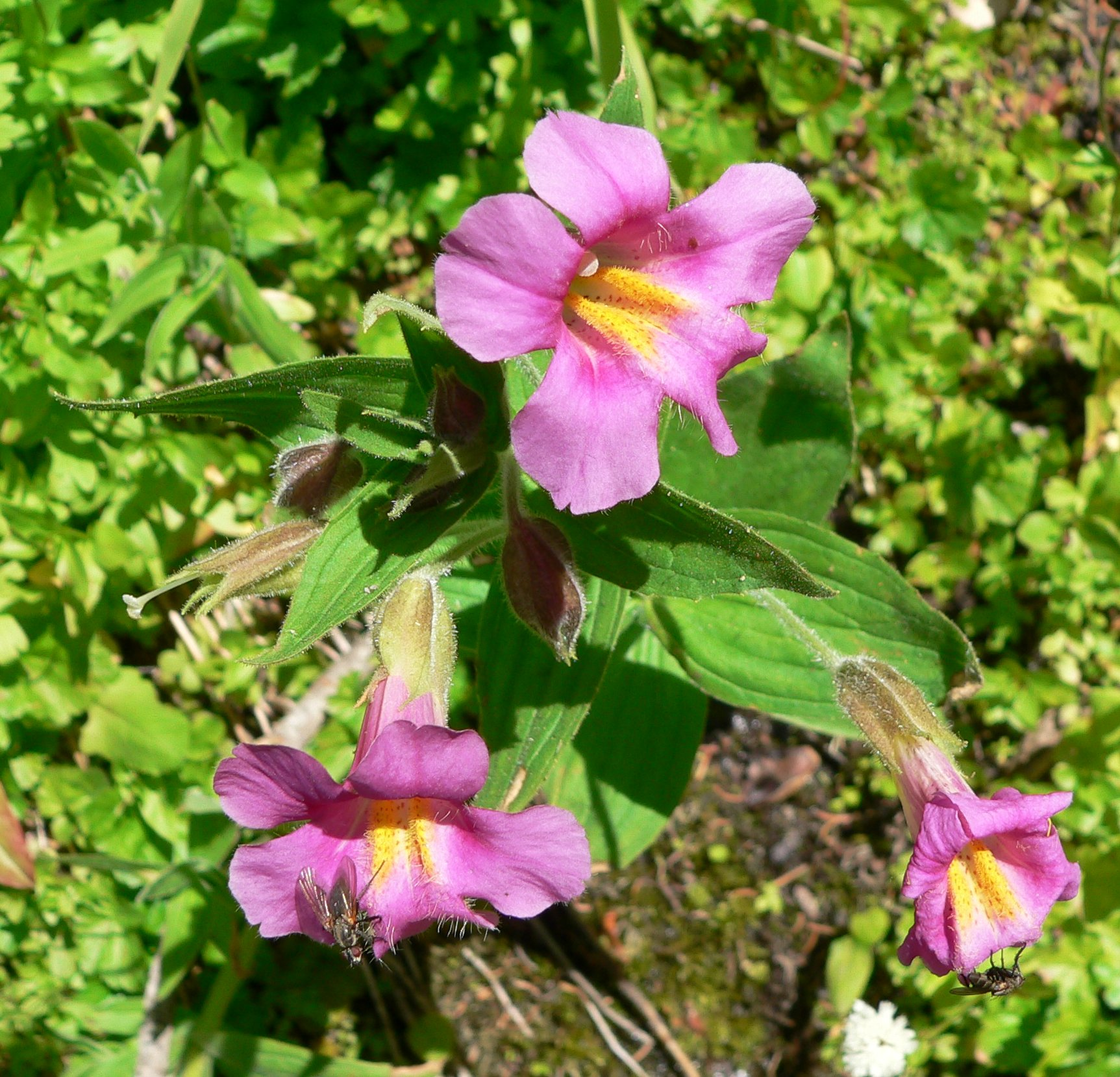
Mimulus lewisii

Schemske's research investigated the ecological factors that contribute to adaptation and speciation, and the genetic architecture of adaptive traits. He used plants as model study systems, and conducted creative and sometimes long term experiments to test evolutionary theory. Schemske's work on the plant genus Mimulus is particularly well known. With long-term collaborator Tony Bradshaw, he bred two Mimulus species together to create a wide array of flower shapes and colours, and was able to show that evolutionary transitions from bee pollination to hummingbird pollination could happen via a small number of genetic changes.

Later in his career Schemske became interested in the ecological and evolutionary processes that create the dramatic increase in diversity from the poles to equator, known as the latitudinal diversity gradient. With Gary Mittlebach and other collaborators, Schemske wrote influential reviews of these processes that inspired extensive research. In particular, he drew attention to the potential role of biotic interactions in driving evolutionary diversification in the tropics.

With then-PhD student Amy Angert, Schemske used reciprocal transplant experiments and experimental evolution to study the processes that limit species' geographic ranges, again using Mimulus.

== Awards and honours ==
In 1986, less than 10 years after his PhD, Schemske won the Mercer Award from the Ecological Society of America, for "an outstanding ecological research paper published within the past two years by a younger researcher" for his 1984 paper on population structure in an annual plant. In 2002, he received the Distinguished Naturalist Award (then known as the E. O. Wilson Naturalist Award) from the American Society of Naturalists. The award citation says

"He not only dwells on the beautiful and enlightening details of living organisms, but he crafts these details into important and broad conceptual insights that inform many natural systems. He won the It is this deep understanding of natural history that makes Douglas Schemke's work so remarkable".

In 2003 he was elected to the US American Academy of Arts and Sciences. Schemske was elected to the US National Academy of Sciences in May 2017 in honour of his distinguished research achievements in population biology and evolutionary ecology.
