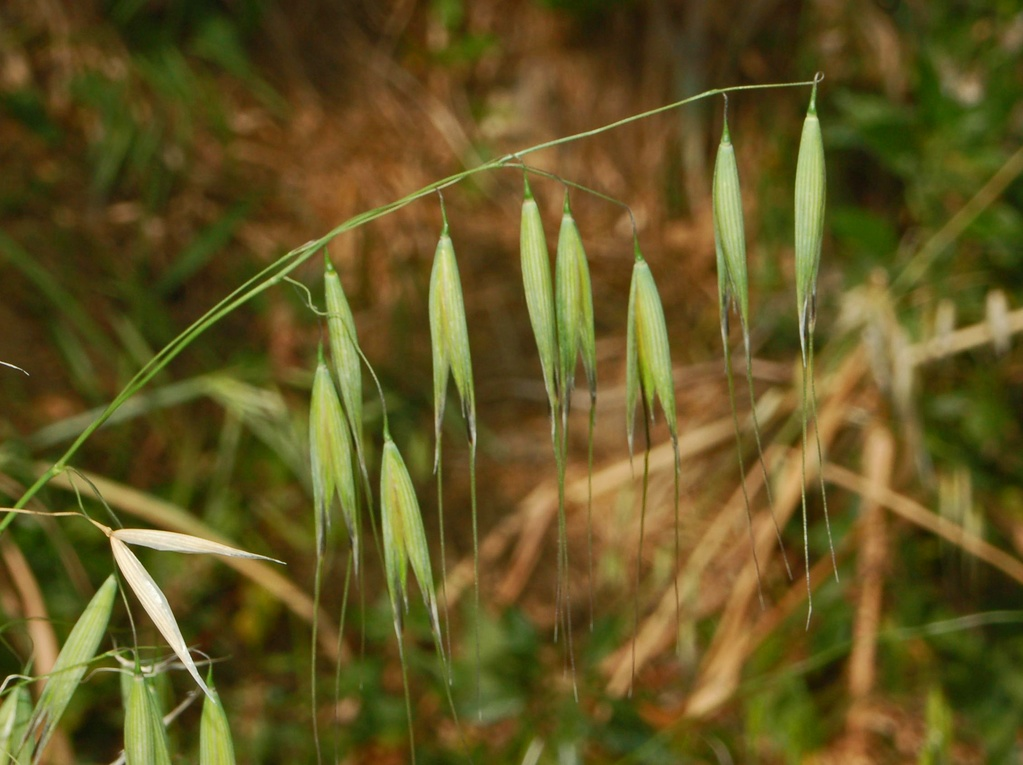

Scientific classification
- Kingdom: Plantae
- Clade: Tracheophytes
- Clade: Angiosperms
- Clade: Monocots
- Clade: Commelinids
- Order: Poales
- Family: Poaceae
- Subfamily: Pooideae
- Genus: Avena
- Species: A. barbata

Binomial name
- Avena barbata Pott ex Link

Synonyms
- Avena hirsuta

= Avena barbata =

Species of grass

Avena barbata is a species of wild oat known by the common name slender wild oat. It has edible seeds. It is a diploidized autotetraploid grass (2n=4x=28). Its diploid ancestors are A. hirtula Lag. and A. wiestii Steud (2n=2x=14), which are considered Mediterranean and desert ecotypes, respectively, comprising a single species. A. wiestii and A. hirtula are widespread in the Mediterranean Basin, growing in mixed stands with A. barbata, though they are difficult to tell apart.

This is a winter annual grass with thin tillers (stems) growing up to 60 to 80 centimeters in maximum height, but known to sometimes grow taller. The bristly spikelets are 2 to 3 centimeters long, not counting the bent awn which is up to 4 centimeters in length. Avena barbata largely reproduces by selfing in natural populations, with very low rates of outcrossing.

A. barbata is native to central Asia (as far east as Pakistan) and the Mediterranean Basin. As an introduced species it also occurs in other Mediterranean-like habitats of New Zealand, Australia, South Africa, Argentina, Chile, Brazil, and Uruguay. In Europe it has been reported in Finland, France, Germany, Norway, Bulgaria, and Austria. In North America it is an introduced species and noxious weed, where it is especially widespread in California. In California it has displaced native species of grass. It is also found in Oregon, Washington, Hawaii, Massachusetts, Nevada, Arizona, and New Mexico.

Genetic evidence indicates that A. barbata in Argentina and California originated from Spain, during the Spanish colonization of the Americas.

== Genetic studies of Californian populations ==
Californian populations of Avena barbata represent one of the most extensively studied examples of putative "ecotypes" in the plant literature. Its population genetics and evolution have been extensively examined since 1967, primarily in the laboratories of R.W. Allard and Subodh Jain and their many students in the 1960s, 1970s, 1980s, and 1990s at U.C. Davis, and more recently by Robert Latta at the University of Dalhousie University in Nova Scotia.

The general pattern that emerged from these earlier studies was that throughout the Central Valley of California, consisting of semiarid grasslands and oak savannahs, and extending south to San Diego, populations of this species were dominated by a monomorphic phenotype possessing dark/black seeds with hairy lemmas, as well as smooth leaf sheaths; these morphological characters were correlated with a specific isozyme pattern as well as a specific ribosomal DNA genotype. This "ecotype" is called the "xeric" type. Populations outside the Central Valley, along the coastal strip, the intermontane regions of the coast ranges, and the higher foothills of the Sierra Nevada mountains, were either monomorphic for white seeds with generally smooth lemmas and hairy leaf sheaths or were polymorphic with varying mixtures of the seed and leaf sheath characters. These populations were also either monomorphic or polymorphic for isozyme patterns and ribosomal DNA genotypes other than the xeric type; they are called the "mesic" type. The mesic type has never apparently been observed south of approximately the same latitude as Monterey, either in coastal ranges, the Central Valley, or the foothills of the Sierras. When the morphological traits as well as the allozyme and ribosomal DNA genotypes were considered together, it is argued that there are six ecotypes in the otherwise "mesic" classification.

Whole-plant studies also showed that the xeric and mesic types differed from each other for many characters such as the flag leaf, primary stem height, number of tillers, weight and number of seeds, dry weight, and flowering time, with the mesic ecotype being generally larger and more fecund, overall, than the xeric type; further, the flag leaves of the xeric type were consistently smaller than the mesic type under many conditions. It was further shown that xeric populations that were monomorphic for the seed and leaf sheath characters and allozymes had a less genetic variation for quantitative genetics characters than mesic populations; however, quantitative genetic variation existed in all xeric or mesic populations that were studied. Consequently, with all genetic characters studied, xeric populations of the xeric ecotype were more similar to each other than they were to the music ecotype, and the evidence indicated that the various ecotypes represented significant linkage disequilibrium and coadapted genetic complexes.

For field identification purposes, the leaf sheath pubescence in the seedling stage and lemma color at seed maturity as well as the flag leaf dimensions would reliably separate the xeric from the mesic ecotypes throughout California.

Early on it was speculated that the genetic patterns observed in A. barbata were highly correlated with rainfall and temperature. The general pattern at both a macro and micro geographical scale was that the monomorphic "xeric" type occurred in those regions with between 250mm and 500mm of rainfall, while the polymorphic and monomorphic "mesic" populations occurred in those areas of California with greater than 500mm.

Regardless of the correlations found with the mesic and xeric genotypes with rainfall in California, greenhouse experiments have not shown that the xeric type has greater reproductive capacity or other physiologic superiority to the mesic under artificially induced wet or dry conditions. In fact Latta argues that the mesic type is superior to the xeric, and may be supplanting the xeric in those areas where the xeric has been dominant, at least in Northern California.

== Genetic studies of Mediterranean populations ==
Avena barbata has been studied in Spain, Israel, and Morocco by students and colleagues of R.W. Allard at U.C. Davis, Pèrez de la Vega and Pedro Garcia of the University of Leon, and E. Nevo in Israel. The general pattern that has emerged is that there is more genetic variability in the Mediterranean populations than there are in Californian populations. Further, the multi-locus genotypes found in California are unique to California. The Mediterranean populations have their own unique sets of multi-locus genotypes. There is a unique 14-locus allozyme genotype specific to the colder regions of Spain.

Neither the "xeric" nor monomorphic "mesic" genotypes described in California are found in Spain.

== Genetic studies of Argentinian populations ==
Both Californian and Argentinian populations represent a subset of the genetic variability found in Spain, on a locus by locus comparison. However, unlike Spain, Argentina has one widespread 14 locus allozyme genotype called the "Pampeano" type, which is not found in Spain; it differs from the Californian "xeric" type at three of the 14 loci examined. The "xeric" Californian type is found in 6% of the plants examined in Argentina; the "xeric" type also occurs in Chile.

The genetic evidence indicates that Avena barbata came to both Argentina and California from southwest Spain.

== Gallery ==
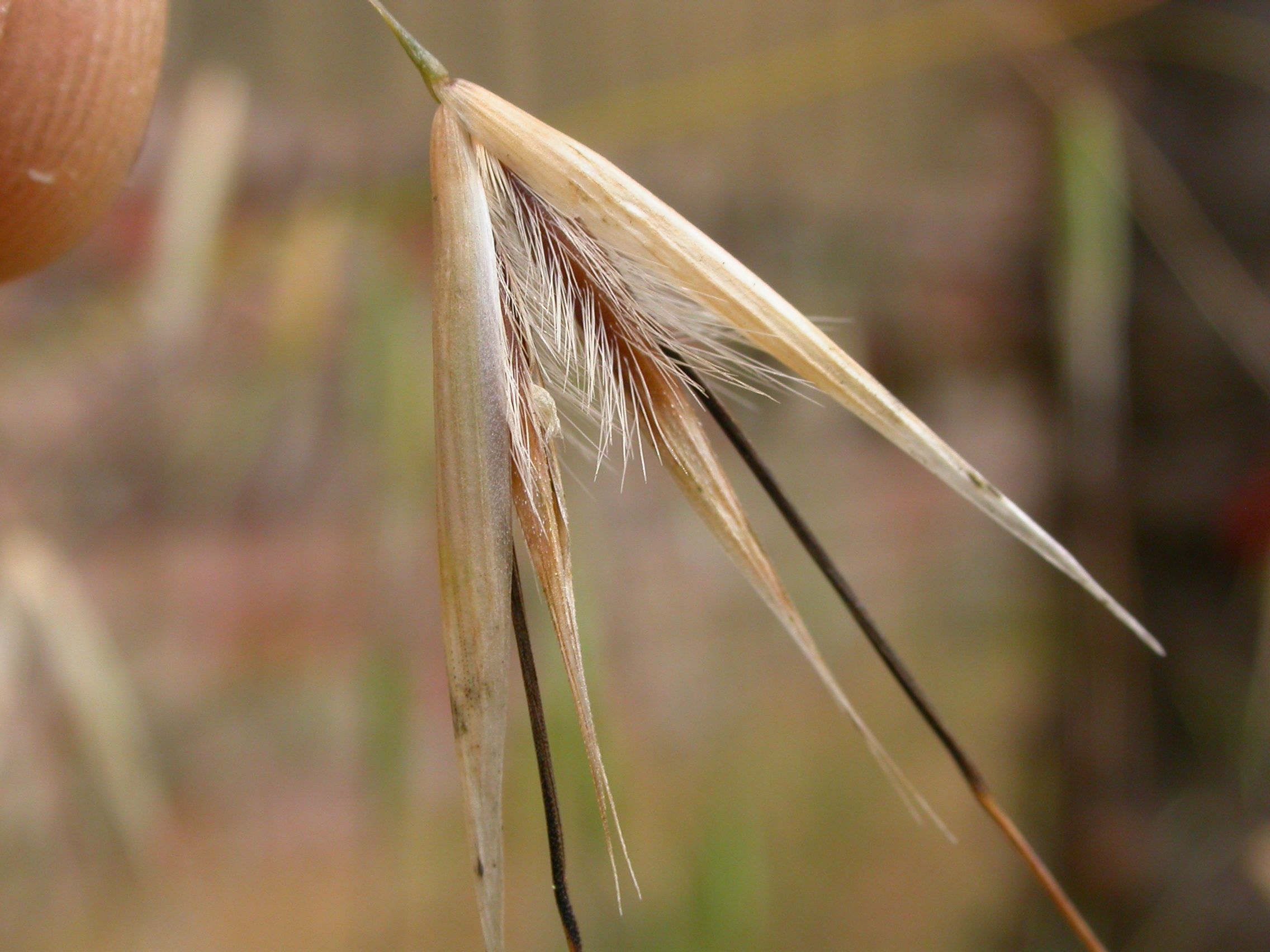
Avena barbata spikelet
