= Gary Allan Polis =

Gary Polis
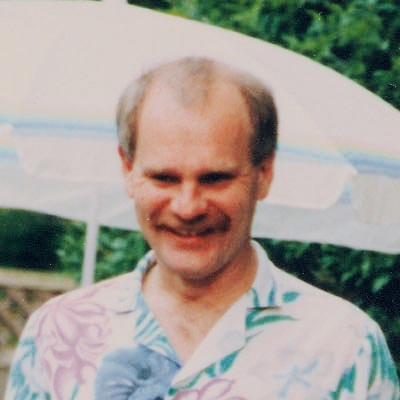
- Born: Los Angeles, California, U.S.
- Died: Sea of Cortez, Baja California, Mexico
- Education: University of California, Riverside
- Known for: Study of Scorpions
- Scientific career
- Fields: Arachnology, Ecology, Environmental Science

Gary Allan Polis (1946 – March 27, 2000) was an arachnologist and the world's leading expert on scorpions.

== Education and career ==
Polis was born in Los Angeles, California. He graduated from Loyola University in 1969. Polis received an M.A. in 1975 and a Ph.D. in biology in 1977 from the University of California, Riverside.

While at UC Riverside, Polis studied under Dr. Roger Farley. He conducted a variety of experiments and did studies of Vaejovidae. He went on to teach at Vanderbilt University from 1979 to 1992 and wrote several books; his Biology of Scorpions has been referred to as the "scorpion Bible." Polis was the subject of the book Scorpion Man by Laurence Pringle.

Polis was noted as a desert ecologist and advised the government on desert scorpions during the Gulf War.

In 1998, Polis became Professor of Environmental Science and Policy at the University of California, Davis, a post he held until his death in 2000.

== Death ==
Polis died in a seastorm in the Sea of Cortez during an ecological expedition. He was cited by a survivor as attempting to help others reach safety as a priority before his own. On the expedition in the Sea Of Cortez were colleagues from Japan, one of whom also died in the accident.
