= Susan Harrison (ecologist) =

Professor of ecology

- Born: Susan Patricia Harrison
- Education: Stanford University; University of California, Davis
- Awards: Member of the National Academy of Sciences (2018)
- Scientific career
- Fields: Ecology
- Workplaces: University of California, Davis
- Thesis: The metapopulation dynamics of the Bay checkerspot butterfly, Euphydryas editha bayensis (1989)
- Website: desp.ucdavis.edu/people/susan-p-harrison

Susan Patricia Harrison is a professor of ecology at the University of California, Davis who works on the dynamics of natural populations and ecological diversity. She is a fellow of the Ecological Society of America and the California Academy of Sciences. She has previously served as vice president of the American Society of Naturalists. She was elected to the National Academy of Sciences in 2018.

== Early life and education ==
Harrison is from Sonoma, California. She studied zoology at University of California, Davis and graduated in 1983. Harrison switched to ecology for her graduate studies, and earned a master's degree in 1986. Harrison joined Stanford University for her doctoral studies, completing her PhD in biology in 1989. Her doctoral work considered the Edith's checkerspot butterfly and was supervised by Paul R. Ehrlich and Richard Karban.

== Research and career ==
After her PhD, Harrison was a postdoctoral fellow at Imperial College London, where she worked at Silwood Park. Harrison was appointed to the faculty at University of California, Davis in 1991. She is a member of the John Muir Institute of the Environment. Her research considers plant species diversity. She has extensively studied the flora of the California region, and found that species and phylogenetic diversity align with the region's climate gradients. The small-scale local diversity is similar to the large-scale diversity within the region. She studied metapopulations, which has previously been explained as existing between colonisation and extinction. Harrison demonstrated that the formation of metapopulations is more complicated; and can be patchy, non-equilibrium and geographical.

She works on both the Californian grasslands and Oregon forest understories. She found that these regions had suffered from climate change, in particular the warmer, drier climate has resulted in a decline in plant community diversity. Species that had functional traits including drought intolerance are particularly vulnerable. In situations where nutrients are the most limiting resource, climate has less of an impact.

Harrison has studied California's wildflowers, which have been shown to be particularly resilient to drought. These wildflowers keep part of their seeds dormant in seed banks underground, which they can disperse when the weather is appropriate. Wildflowers that are more resilient to drought have larger underground seed banks. She has also studied California's wildfires near the Stebbins Cold Canyon Reserve. Almost half of the grasslands studied by Harrison were impacted by the 2015 California wildfires. She has studied the native plant species in the serpentine soils of California with Brian Anacker.

In 2018, Harrison was elected to the National Academy of Sciences. She serves on the scientific advisory board of the Siskiyou County Field Institute. She is a member of the editorial board of the Proceedings of the Royal Society.

== Awards and honours ==
- 1997 International Recognition of Professional Excellence Prize
- 2004 Fellow of the California Academy of Sciences
- 2005 American Society of Naturalists Vice-President
- 2013 Fellow of the Ecological Society of America
- 2018 Elected a member of the National Academy of Sciences (NAS)

== Selected works ==
- Harrison, Susan (2011). Serpentine: The Evolution and Ecology of a Model System. University of California Press. ISBN 978-0520268357.
