= Robert W. Allard =

American geneticist (1919–2003)

- Born: Robert Wayne Allard; September 3, 1919; San Fernando Valley, California, US
- Died: March 25, 2003 (aged 83); Davis, California, US
- Spouse: Ann Catherine Wilson Allard
- Children: Susan Ann; Thomas Wilson (deceased); Jane Ellen; Gillian Elizabeth; Stacie Roberta
- Awards: DeKalb-Pfizer Distinguished Career; Crop Science Science of America; Member, National Academy of Sciences 1973; Fellow, American Academy of Arts and Sciences 1985

Robert Wayne Allard (September 3, 1919 – March 25, 2003) was an American plant breeder and plant population geneticist who is regarded as one of the leading plant population geneticists of the 20th century. Allard became chair of the genetics department at University of California, Davis in 1967; he was elected to the National Academy of Sciences in 1973, and was awarded the DeKalb-Pfizer Distinguished Career Award and the Crop Science Science of America Award. He was honored as the Nilsson-Ehle Lecturer of the Mendelian Society of Sweden and as the Wilhelmine Key lecturer of the American Genetic Association. He also served as president of the Genetics Society of America, the American Genetic Association and the American Society of Naturalists.

As chair of the department of genetics at U.C. Davis he played a major role in bringing Theodosius Dobzhansky and Francisco J. Ayala to the genetics department in the early 1970s. With G. Ledyard Stebbins there as well, the department became preeminent in both plant and animal evolution. He trained 56 doctorate students and more than 100 masters students over his career.

== Education ==
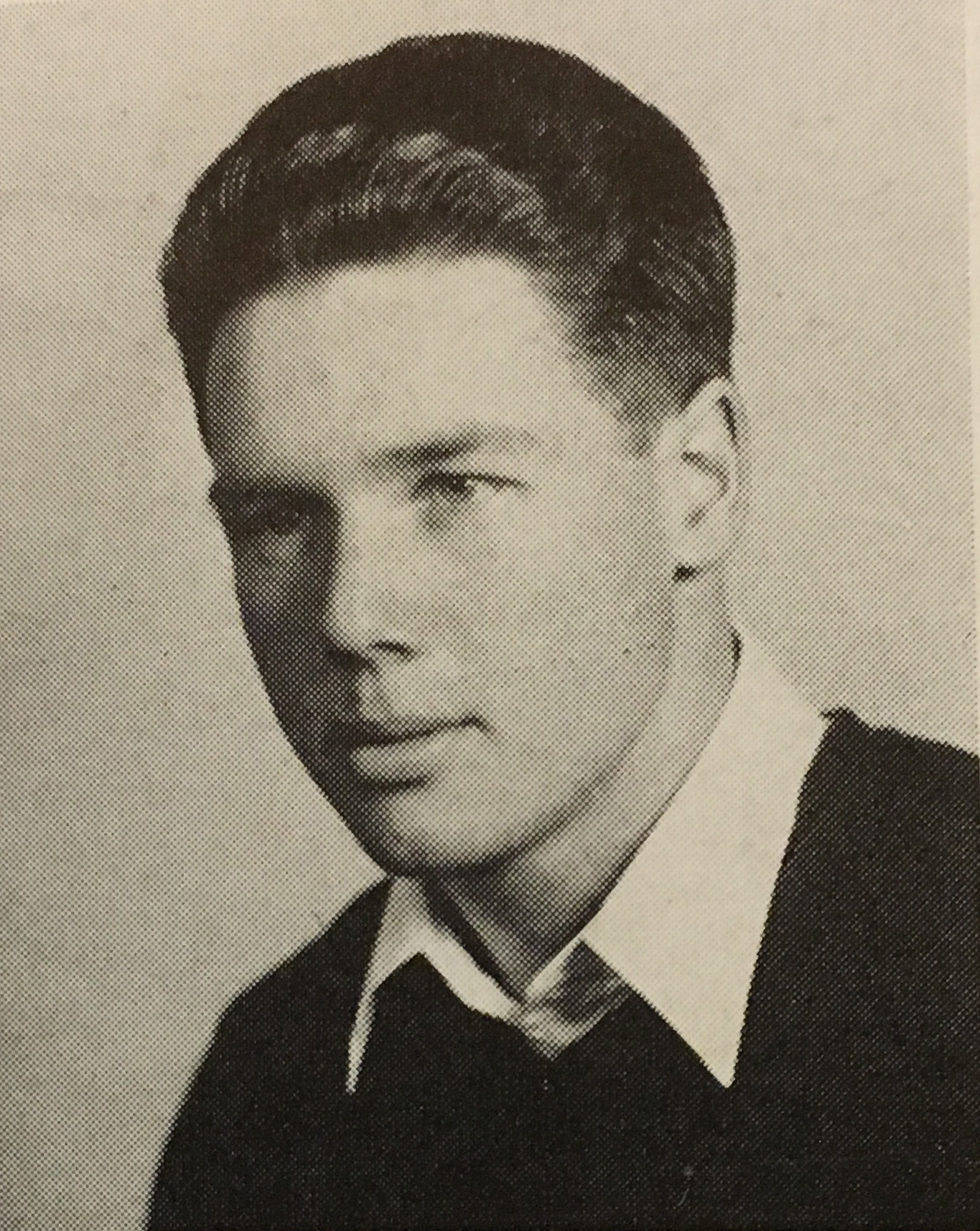
Allard Staff U.C. Davis Staff Editor 1939

Allard entered U.C. Davis as an undergraduate in 1937, and attended the University of Wisconsin–Madison for graduate training. His PhD work was interrupted by World War II, where he engaged in biowarfare research. After the War he returned to U.W. Madison to defend his Ph.D. thesis on wheat cytogenetics.

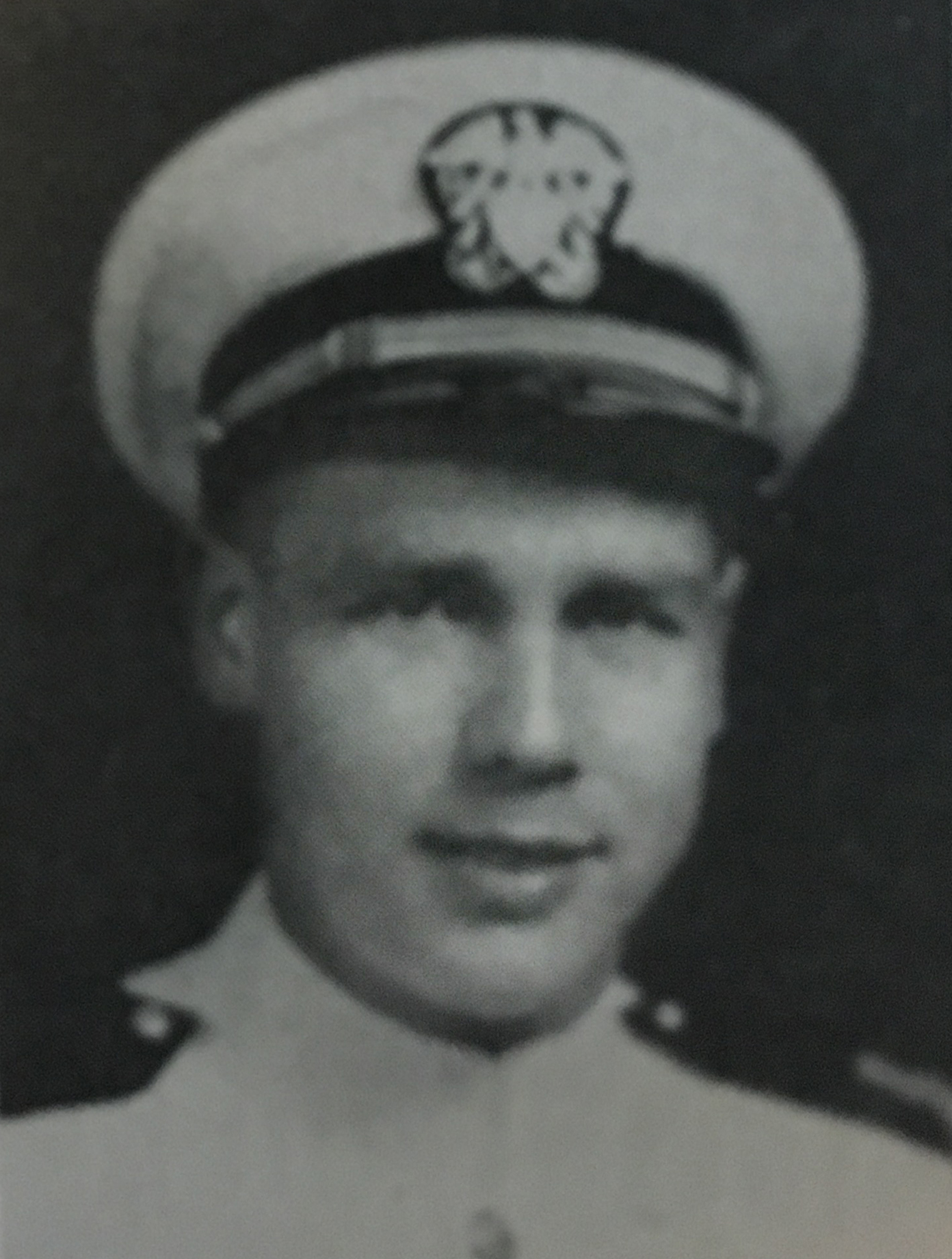
R.W. Allard as U.S. Navy Ensign, 1944

== Early career and research ==
He joined the faculty at U.C. Davis in 1946, where he was hired as a plant breeder in the agronomy department. He worked on developing varieties of lima beans, in addition to studying the inheritance of its seed coat polymorphisms as well as this plant's basic genetics. He also worked on wheat diseases.

In the 1950s, he also started doing research in the area of quantitative genetics, and by the 1960s he had broadened his use of experimental plants to include barley.

Additionally at this time he published perhaps his most important publication, the 1960 book "Principles of Plant Breeding", which was translated into 17 languages, and was the principal plant breeding book for at least a generation. A second edition was published in 1999.

His ever-expanding interests led him into plant population genetics, a field that he essentially founded. His particular interest was in the population genetics of Inbreeding species, and included wild plants such as Collinsia, Avena barbata and Avena fatua. His interest in inbreeding species probably stemmed from his interactions with Ledyard Stebbins, who was also at U.C. Davis, and had predicted that wild inbreeding plant populations should be devoid of genetic variation. As a plant breeder who had done selection on inbreeding species in cultivated plants, Allard knew that there was ample genetic variation within "pure lines." It is easy to see how he would have become intrigued with inbreeding wild species. And indeed starting in the early 1960s he worked with experimental populations of wheat, barley, and lima beans as well as the wild plants Collinsia, Avena barbata, and Avena fatua investigating a wide variety of issues important to the population genetics of inbreeding species. He published numerous foundational papers on the effects of mating systems, selection, gene-environment interactions, linkage disequilibrium, and genetic drift on the genetic variation of inbreeding plant populations.

Starting at the latter part of the 1960s and to the end of his career, Allard and co-workers focused primarily in a new area for his lab, that of ecological genetics, particularly in the plant Avena barbata. This work was greatly assisted at the end of the 1960s and throughout the 1970s and 1980s by the use of molecular markers known as isozymes combined with traditional quantitative genetics and morphological single-marker traits as well as more advanced molecular techniques as these became available in the 1980s and 1990s and were applied to Avena barbata and other species such as wild and cultivated barley and pines.

An over-riding theme of Allard's lifetime work was the demonstration of "favorable epistatic combinations of alleles of different loci", or multilocus gene complexes in wild and cultivated plants that were assembled in and adapted to specific habitats. To illustrate this theme his last two papers focused on two in-breeding species (the slender wild oat Avena barbata and barley Hordeum vulgare) and one outcrossing species, corn (Zea maize).
