= William Pegram =

Confederate Army officer in the American Civil War

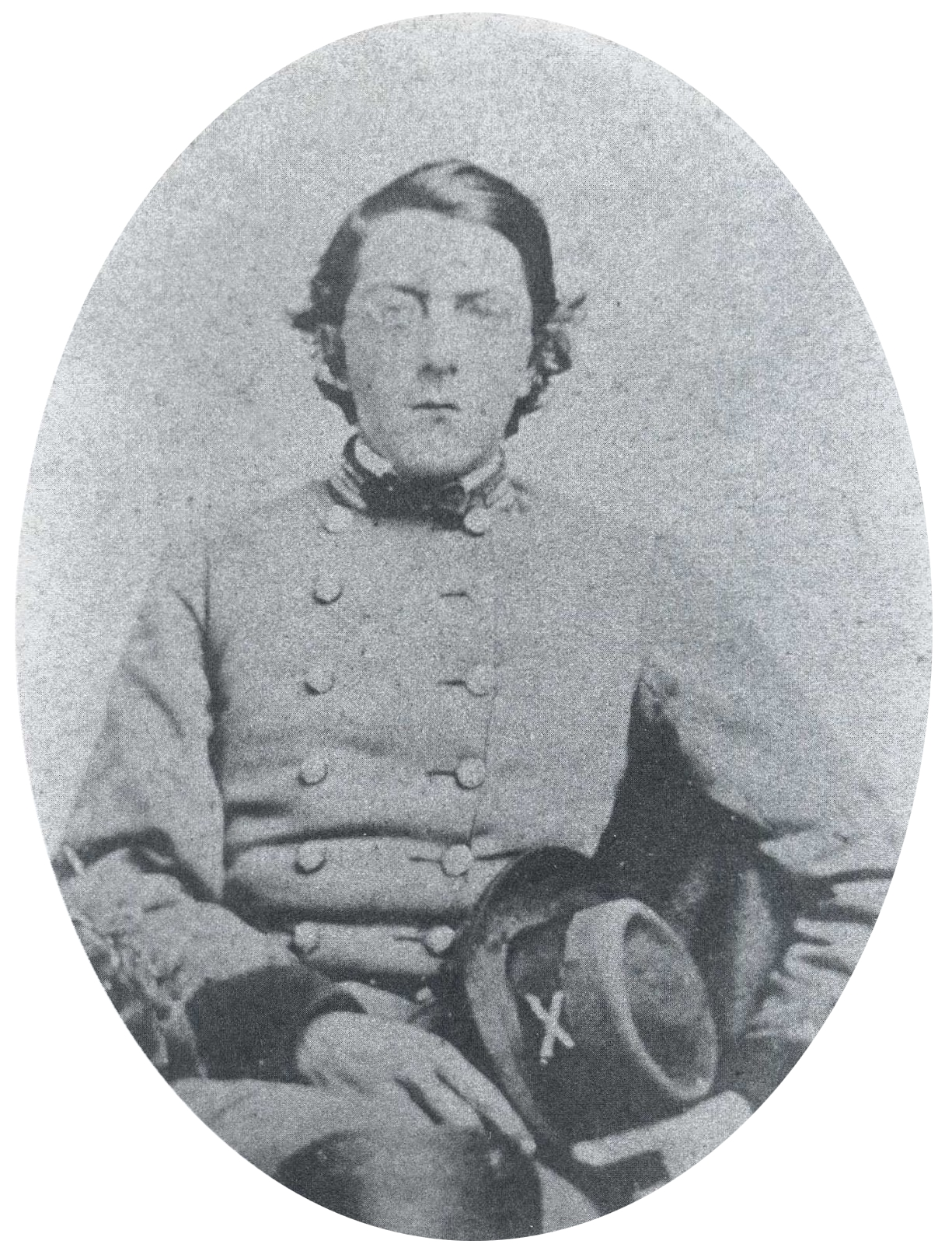
- Born: June 29, 1841; Richmond, Virginia
- Died: April 2, 1865 (aged 23); Dinwiddie County, Virginia
- Burial place: Hollywood Cemetery; Richmond, Virginia
- Military career
- Allegiance: Confederate States of America
- Branch: Confederate States Army
- Service years: 1861–65
- Rank: Colonel
- Nickname: Willy
- Commands: Purcell Battery, Virginia Light Artillery; Pegram's Artillery Battalion
- Conflicts: American Civil War; Eastern Theater; Battle of Five Forks †

William Ransom Johnson Pegram, known as "Willie" or "Willy", (June 29, 1841 – April 2, 1865) was an artillery officer in Robert E. Lee's Confederate Army of Northern Virginia during the American Civil War. He was mortally wounded in the Battle of Five Forks. He was the younger brother of Confederate General John Pegram, who was also killed in action. His grandfather, John Pegram, was a major general during the War of 1812.

== Early life ==
Born in a house along Main Street in Richmond, Virginia, Pegram was a student at the University of Virginia's law school when the Civil War broke out in 1861.

== Civil War ==
Pegram quickly enlisted in an artillery battery from Richmond known as the "Purcell Artillery" in April 1861. The youthful Pegram would become General A. P. Hill's favorite artillery officer. He gained a reputation for his scholarly looks—extreme nearsightedness required that he wear his gold-rimmed spectacles even in the heat of battle–and for his utter fearlessness in battle. Confederate General Henry Heth commented that Pegram was "one of the few men who, I believe, was supremely happy when in battle." One of his soldiers recalled that Pegram thought "A soldier should always seek the most desperate post that has to be filled."

Pegram amassed a commendable combat record during the Civil War, first with A.P. Hill's famous "Light Division" and then with Hill's Third Corps. He fought in virtually every major action in the Eastern theater in which the Army of Northern Virginia was engaged.

Willy Pegram rose through the ranks from private to colonel of artillery in command of sixty guns. There was a movement afoot to make him a general, but nothing ever came of it. It is said that both division level commanders Henry Heth and Richard H. Anderson separately asked for his promotion and assignment to command of an infantry brigade, and A.P. Hill endorsed Heth's recommendation of Pegram: "No officer of the Army of Northern Virginia has done more to deserve this promotion than lieutenant colonel Pegram." But Lee did not promote Pegram, saying, "He is too young—how old is Colonel Pegram?" Heth had answered: "I do not know, but I suppose about 25." Lee replied: "I think a man of 25 is as good as he ever will be; what he acquires after that age is from experience; but I can't understand, when an officer is doing excellent service where he is, why he should want to change." And so, the recommendations for Pegram to be promoted were returned with the statement that "the artillery could not lose the services of so valuable an officer." Indeed, many thought that Pegram was the best gunner in the Army of Northern Virginia.

Willy's older brother, John, was a West Point graduate of the class of 1854. John was killed just two months earlier and near the same location at the Battle of Hatcher's Run in February 1865. The death devastated Willy, who had always been close to his older brother.

== Death ==
Willy Pegram once stated, "Men, whenever the enemy takes a gun from my battery, look for my dead body in front of it." On April 1, 1865, at the Battle of Five Forks - a battle Southern historian Douglas Southall Freeman deemed "a day of disaster not to be recorded solely in terms of four guns lost or of good soldiers captured" - Pegram finally suffered the loss of one of his guns while he lay mortally wounded beside it. He lingered into the evening, dying at 8 o'clock the next morning. He was buried in Richmond's Hollywood Cemetery.

Pegram went by the nickname of Willy or Willie. His family members apparently used the spelling of "Willy" as does his modern biographer. Freeman, and many other Civil War authors, spell the name as "Willie." General Joseph R. Anderson, of Tredegar Iron Works fame, married Pegram's sister Mary Evans in 1881.
