= John Pegram (general) =

Confederate Army general (1832–1865)

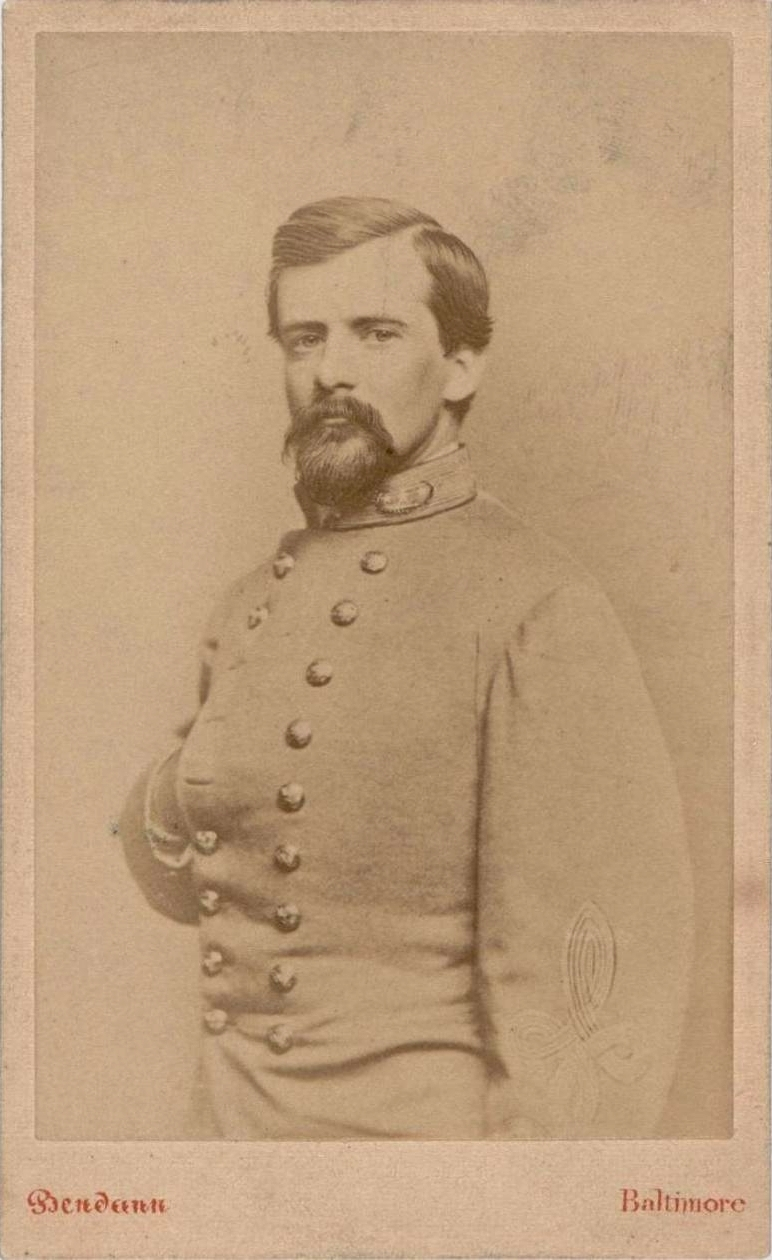
- Born: January 24, 1832; Petersburg, Virginia
- Died: February 6, 1865 (aged 33); Dinwiddie County, Virginia
- Burial place: Hollywood Cemetery; Richmond, Virginia
- Spouse: Hetty Cary (m. 1865)
- Military career
- Allegiance: Confederate States of America
- Branch: Confederate States Army
- Service years: 1861–1865
- Rank: First Lieutenant (USA); Brigadier General (CSA)
- Unit: 2nd U.S. Dragoons
- Commands: 20th Virginia Infantry; Pegram's Cavalry Brigade; Pegram's Cavalry Division; Pegram's Brigade; Early's Division
- Conflicts: American Civil War: Western Virginia Campaign; Battle of Rich Mountain (surrendered); Confederate Heartland Offensive; Stones River Campaign; Chickamauga Campaign; Overland Campaign; Valley Campaigns of 1864; Petersburg Campaign; Battle of Hatcher's Run †

John Pegram (January 24, 1832 – February 6, 1865) was a career soldier from Virginia who served as an officer in the United States Army and then as a brigadier general in the Confederate Army during the American Civil War. He became the first former U.S. Army officer to be captured in Confederate service in 1861 and was killed in action near the end of the war.

== Early life and career ==
John Pegram was born in Petersburg, Virginia, the oldest son of third generation planter James West Pegram and Virginia Johnson Pegram. His grandfather and namesake, John Pegram, had been a major general, commanding all Virginia forces during the War of 1812. His father, James Pegram, was a prominent attorney, militia brigadier general, and bank president in Richmond. However, in October 1844, James Pegram was killed in a steamboat accident on the Ohio River, leaving a widow, who had to open a girls' school to support her five children. One of John Pegram's younger brothers was the future Confederate artillerist William Ransom Johnson Pegram. His great-grandmother's half-brother was North Carolina senator Nathaniel Macon.

Pegram was appointed to the United States Military Academy in 1850. He graduated four years later, ranking tenth in his class, which also included future generals J.E.B. Stuart, Stephen D. Lee and Oliver O. Howard. Pegram was commissioned as a second lieutenant and assigned to the dragoons. He served at a variety of garrisons and outposts in the West. In January 1857, he was appointed Assistant Instructor of Cavalry at West Point. Pegram was granted a leave of absence in 1858–59 to travel to Europe to observe the Austro-Sardinian War. Returning home, he was assigned in 1860 to duty on the frontier in the New Mexico Territory.

== Civil War ==
In May 1861, when news arrived that his native Virginia had seceded, Pegram resigned his lieutenant's commission and returned home. In early July 1861, he accepted a commission as a lieutenant colonel and was assigned command of the 20th Virginia Infantry. His regiment was part of the brigade of Brig. Gen. Robert S. Garnett and served in western Virginia fighting Union troops under Maj. Gen. George B. McClellan. On July 11, 1861, cut off from Garnett's main body during the Battle of Rich Mountain, Pegram controversially surrendered his entire regiment to the Federals. Thus John Pegram became the first former U.S. Army officer to be captured while in Confederate service. His men were paroled, but Pegram was imprisoned for six months in Fort Warren in Boston harbor.

In January 1862, Pegram was paroled in Baltimore, Maryland, and allowed to travel to Richmond while awaiting a formal exchange for a captive Union officer. There, he met prominent socialite Hetty Cary, who became his fiancée. When finally exchanged, Pegram was promoted to colonel and became the Chief Engineer of the army of General Pierre G. T. Beauregard and then to Braxton Bragg. Within a short time, he was assigned as Chief of Staff for Maj. Gen. Edmund Kirby Smith and served in the Kentucky Campaign.

Pegram was promoted to brigadier general in November 1862 and given command of a cavalry brigade. His performance before the Battle of Stones River in December was criticized by his superiors for failing to provide proper intelligence on enemy movements. In March 1863, he led an ill-fated raid into Kentucky that was defeated at the Battle of Somerset and drew criticism from his subordinate officers, including John Hunt Morgan. He remained in command, however, and was ordered to report to the Army of Northern Virginia in October after he requested reassignment back to the Eastern Theater. However, before leaving, Pegram and his division fought under Nathan Bedford Forrest at the Battle of Chickamauga.

Hetty Cary

Pegram was given command of a veteran Virginia infantry brigade in the division of Jubal A. Early. In May, Pegram was wounded at the Battle of the Wilderness and went home to recuperate. Returning to field duty that fall, he served with distinction during Early's independent Valley Campaign as a division commander. Following the disastrous Battle of Cedar Creek, Early's survivors, including Pegram, returned to the Army of Northern Virginia in the Petersburg trenches.

On January 19, 1865, Pegram married Hetty Cary in a well-attended ceremony in St. Paul's Church in Richmond. Among the celebrants was Confederate President Jefferson Davis and his wife, Varina. Less than three weeks later, Pegram was killed in action during the Battle of Hatcher's Run. His funeral was held in the same church where he had recently been married, with many of the same attendees. His younger brother William would be killed in some of the war's last fighting at the Battle of Five Forks in April.

Pegram was buried in Richmond's Hollywood Cemetery.

== In fiction ==
In MacKinlay Kantor's 1961 alternate history book If the South Had Won the Civil War, Pegram appears as one of several prominent people who would have campaigned for the Abolition of Slavery in an independent Confederacy and eventually achieved it by 1885.

== See also ==
- List of American Civil War generals (Confederate)
