= Norman Giles =

American geneticist (1915–2006)

Norman Henry Giles
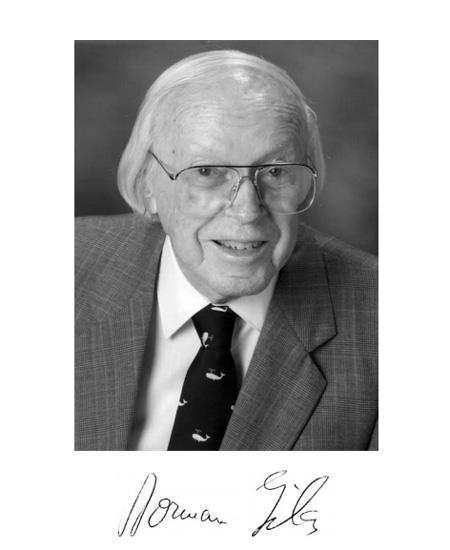
- Norman H. Giles
- Born: August 6, 1915; Atlanta, Georgia
- Died: October 16, 2006 (aged 91)
- Education: Emory University (BA), Harvard University (PhD)
- Known for: Mutations of Neurospora crassa
- Awards: Lamar Dodd Award: University of Georgia (1985); Thomas Hunt Morgan Medal (1988): Genetics Society of America
- Scientific career
- Fields: Microbial genetics
- Workplaces: Yale University, University of Georgia

Norman Henry Giles (August 6, 1915 – October 16, 2006) was an American microbial geneticist who studied mutations of Neurospora crassa.

Norman H. Giles was a pioneer in genetics research. He was a member of the Botany Department at Yale University starting as an Instructor in Botany and rising to Professor of Biology (1951-1961). He then became Professor of Genetics (1961-1972). In 1972 Giles accepted a professorship at the University of Georgia where he established an active program in genetics that in 1980 became the Department of Genetics. He retired in 1986. Giles made important scientific contributions in the areas of intragenic complementation, gene conversion and analysis of gene clusters. His early work on intragenic complementation led to the insight that complementation between allelic mutants is of widespread occurrence and likely involves interactions occurring in the cytoplasm between defective gene products, that is between polypeptides. This early insight led to numerous further studies of intragenic complementation that amplified this initial insight (see for example).

== Notable papers ==
- 1940: "The effects of fast neutrons on the chromosomes of Tradescantia". Proc. Natl. Acad. Sci. U.S.A. 26:567-575.
- 1948: With E. Z. Lederberg, "Induced reversions of biochemical mutants in Neurospora crassa". Am. J. Bot. 35:150-157.
- 1950: With H. P. Riley, "Studies on the mechanism of oxygen effect on the radiosensitivity of Tradescantia chromosomes". Proc. Natl. Acad. Sci. U.S.A. 36:337-344.
- 1950: With A. V. Beatty, "The effect of x-irradiation in oxygen and in hydrogen at normal and positive pressures on chromosome aberration frequency in Tradescantia microspores". Science 112:643-645.
- 1951: "Studies on the mechanism of reversion in biochemical mutants of Neurospora crassa". Cold Spring Harb. Sym. 16:283-313.
- 1956: "Forward and back mutation at specific loci in Neurospora". Brookhaven Sym. Biol. 8:103-125.
- 1957: With C. W. H. Partridge and N. J. Nelson, "The genetic control of adenylosuccinase in Neurospora crassa". Proc. Natl. Acad. Sci. U.S.A. 43:305-317.
- 1957: With E. H. Y. Chu, "A study of primate chromosome complements". Am. Nat. 91:273-282.
- 1958: With M. E. Case, "Evidence from tetrad analyses for both normal and aberrant recombination between allelic mutants in Neurospora crassa". Proc. Natl. Acad. Sci. U.S.A. 44:378-390.
