= William Keith Brooks =

American zoologist

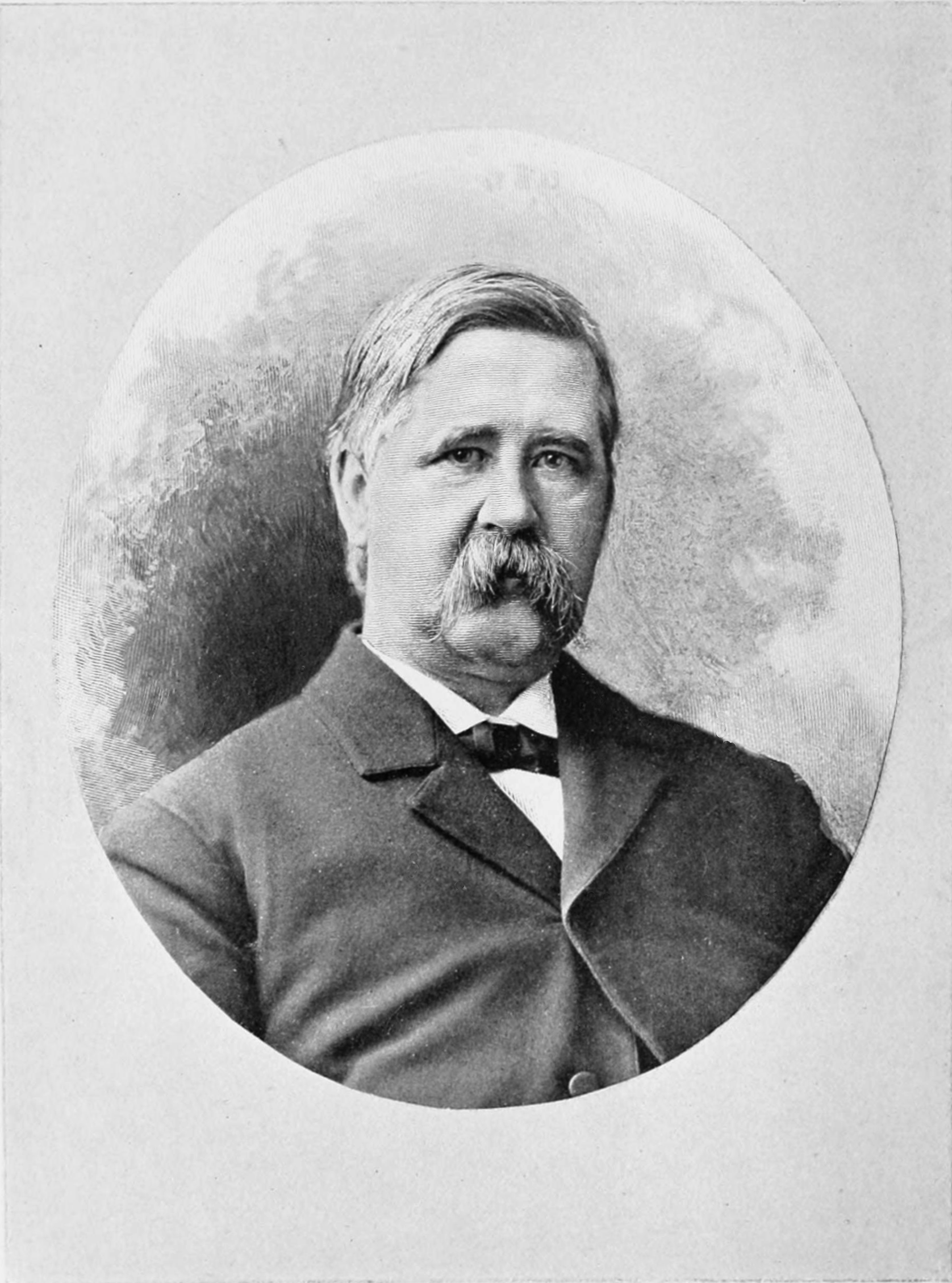
- William Keith Brooks in Popular Science Monthly, 1899

William Keith Brooks (March 25, 1848 – November 12, 1908) was an American zoologist, born in Cleveland, Ohio, March 25, 1848. Brooks studied embryological development in invertebrates and founded a marine biological laboratory where he and others studied heredity. His best known book, The Oyster, was first published in 1891 and has been reprinted many times.

== Biography ==
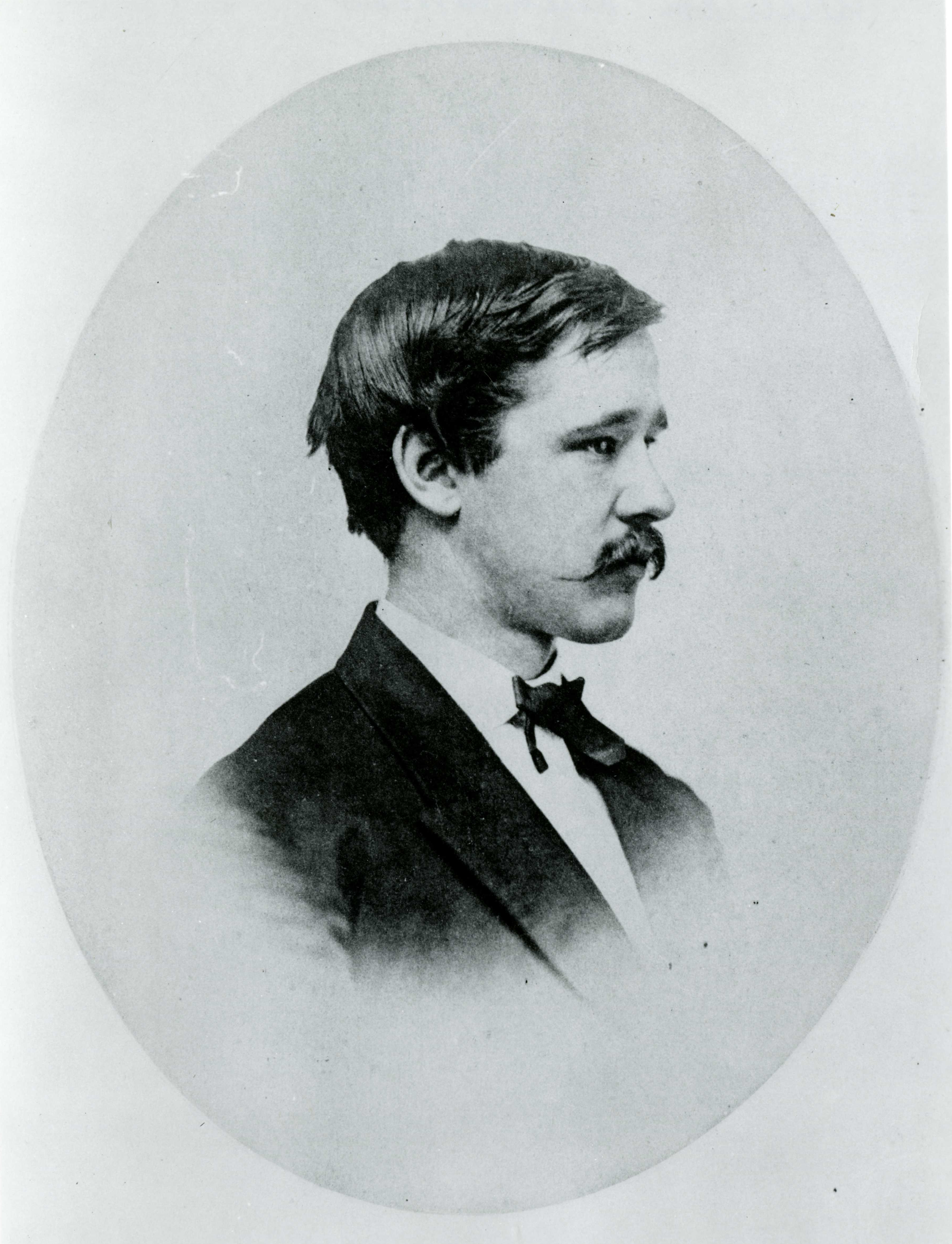
c. 1869

Brooks was proficient in many subjects, including Greek and biology, and as a young man was unsure where he wished to focus his studies. He spent two years at Hobart College before settling on biology, and then transferred to Williams College, where he received his BA in 1870. He then entered Harvard and studied under Louis Agassiz, receiving his PhD in 1875. A year later he became a junior faculty member at Johns Hopkins University when it opened, teaching and researching marine biology.

After marrying Amelia Katherine Schultz in 1878, Brooks founded the Chesapeake Zoological Laboratory. He spent most summers at this laboratory, which moved around each summer from Crisfield, Maryland, and Hampton, Virginia, to Beaufort, North Carolina, Jamaica, and the Tortugas. Commissioned by the state of Maryland to study the American oyster, Brooks’ findings led to the discovery that fertilization of this type of oyster, unlike the European form, occurred outside the body.

At Hopkins, Brooks began as an associate (equivalent to assistant professor) and advanced to associate professor in 1883 and was made Professor of Morphology in 1889. In 1894 he succeeded H. Newell Martin as head of the Department of Biology. During his research, Brooks performed studies on invertebrates, particularly germ cells, and found evidence to explain variation among species due to ancestral heredity as well as Charles Darwin’s theory of pangenesis.

In addition to his publications, Brooks received honorary degrees from Hobart College, Williams College, and the University of Pennsylvania. He was a member of the American Philosophical Society, National Academy of Sciences, the National Philosophical Society, Academy of Natural Sciences of Philadelphia, the Boston Society of Natural History, the Maryland Academy of Arts and Sciences, the American Society of Zoologists, the American Association for the Advancement of Science, and the Royal Microscopical Society.

Brooks died in 1908 due to a congenital heart defect.

== Publications ==
He published:

- Hand-Book of Invertebrate Zoölogy (1882)
- The Law of Heredity (1883)
- The Development and Protection of the Oyster in Maryland (1884)
- Lucifer: A Study in Morphology (1881)
- The Stomatopoda of H. M. S. Challenger (1886)
- The Oyster (1891)
- A Monograph of the Genus Salpa (1893)
- Foundations of Zoölogy (1899)

== Sources ==
- Jordan, ed., Leading Men of Science, (New York, 1910), pages 427-455
- William Keith Brooks; a sketch of his life (1910). From Internet Archive.
