= McPeak =

McPeak is a surname. Notable people with the surname include:

- Bill McPeak (1926–1991), American football player and coach
- Holly McPeak (born 1969), American beach volleyball player
- Mark McPeak (born 1968), Northern Irish bowls player
- Merrill McPeak (born 1936), American politician and Chief of Staff of the United States Air Force
- Sandy McPeak (1936–1997), American actor
- Tony McPeak (footballer), Scottish footballer
- Vivian McPeak (born 1958), American activist and musician
