= The American Naturalist =

- Discipline: Ecology, Evolution, Ethology
- Language: English
- Edited by: Volker H. W. Rudolf

Publication details
- History: 1867–present
- Publisher: University of Chicago Press on behalf of the American Society of Naturalists (United States)
- Frequency: Monthly
- Impact factor: 2.4 (2023)

Standard abbreviations
- ISO 4: Am. Nat.

Indexing
- ISSN: 0003-0147
- LCCN: 00-227441
- JSTOR: 00030147
- OCLC no.: 45446849

Links
- Journal homepage; Society website

The American Naturalist is the monthly peer-reviewed scientific journal of the American Society of Naturalists, whose purpose is "to advance and to diffuse knowledge of organic evolution and other broad biological principles so as to enhance the conceptual unification of the biological sciences." It was established in 1867 and is published by the University of Chicago Press. The journal covers research in ecology, evolutionary biology and behavior. As of 2023, the editor-in-chief is Volker H. W. Rudolf. According to the Journal Citation Reports, the journal had a 2023 impact factor of 2.4.

== History ==
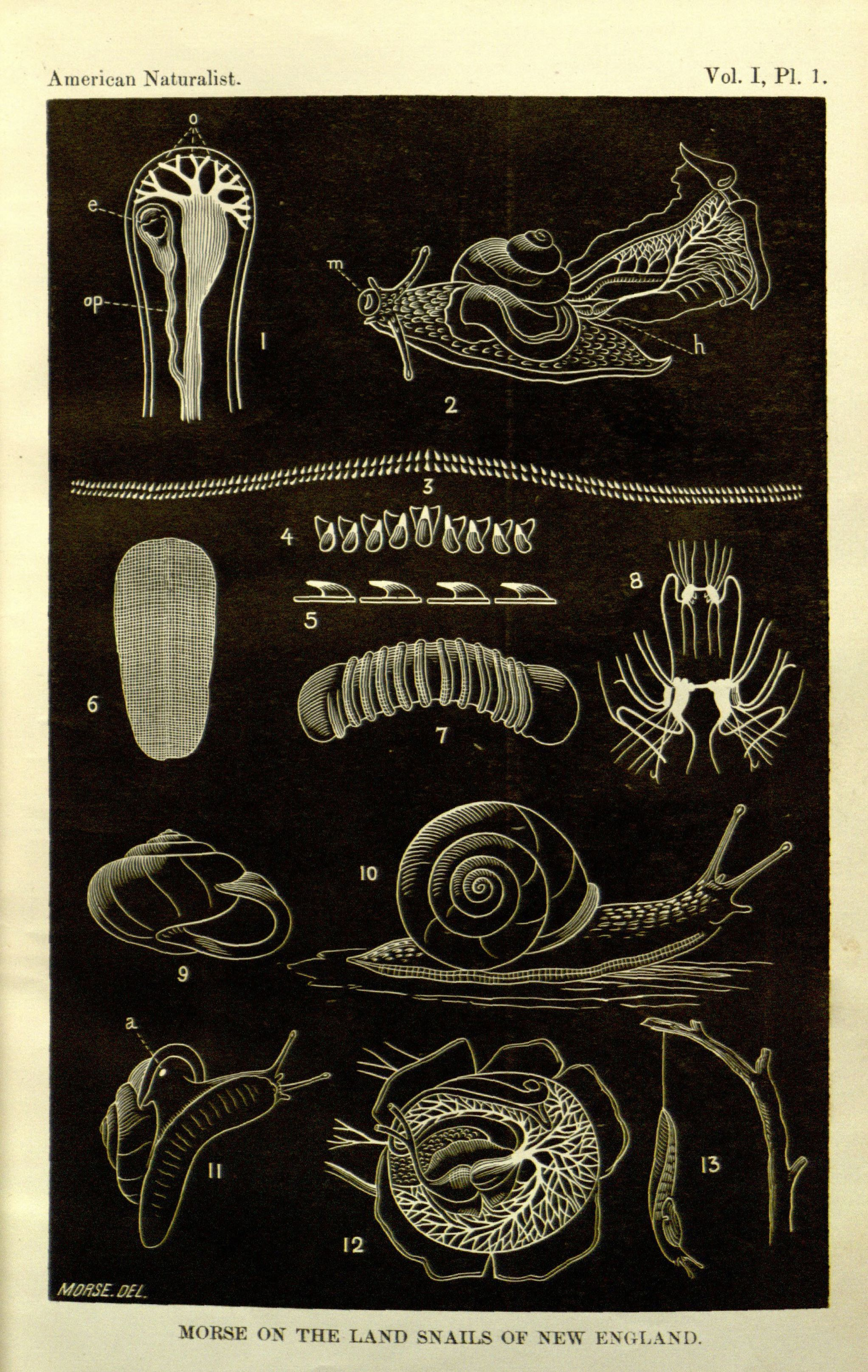
Plate 1 from the first issue of the Journal, showing land snails of New England. Engraved by Edward S. Morse

The journal was founded by Alpheus Hyatt, Edward S. Morse, Alpheus S. Packard Jr., and Frederick W. Putnam at the Essex Institute in Salem, Massachusetts. The first issue appeared in print dated March 1867. In 1885 the four men founded the American Society of Naturalists, where in 1887 the journal was designated an official organ of the society for publication.

In 1878 the journal was for sale and Edward Cope bought half the rights. He moved the journal to Philadelphia and arranged to edit it jointly with Professor Alpheus S. Packard Jr. Cope became editor-in-chief in 1887 and continued in that capacity until his death in 1897.

In 1897, a group of professors from the Massachusetts Institute of Technology, Harvard University, and Tufts University bought the rights from the Cope estate and kept the journal in publication until 1907 when J. McKeen Cattell acquired control. Cattell's son Jacques became co-editor and publisher with his father in 1939.

Although the ASN became increasingly involved in editing The American Naturalist through changes in 1941 and 1951, the journal remained with the Cattell family until 1968, when the University of Chicago Press took it over after Jaques Cattell's death.
