= Robert O. Lawton =

American English professor (1924–1980)

Robert O. Lawton (1924–1980) was a professor and academic administrator at Florida State University (FSU) who received the Distinguished Service Cross for his service during World War II.

== Life and career ==
Lawton was born in Greenwood, South Carolina on December 28, 1924. He attended Wofford College until joining the U.S. Army during World War II. He became a Sergeant in the Infantry, serving in the Timberwolf Division, and was injured in combat in Germany. He was awarded the Distinguished Service Cross for his "singular action, outstanding courage and extreme devotion to duty." He was later injured in combat in Germany. He married Elise Nicholson (of Greenwood), and they raised a son (Robert O. Lawton III) and a daughter (Elise Lawton) together. After the war he studied at Duke University, where he earned the A.B.(1946), M.A. (1947), and Ph.D. (1949) degrees in English.

Lawton came to FSU as an instructor in 1949, and in 1952 he relocated to Eglin Air Force Base and became the director of FSU's Armed Forces College there as part of its new "Bootstrap" program. In 1954 he took on a similar role at Ramey Air Force Base in Puerto Rico, and eventually returned to FSU's Tallahassee campus as director of the entire Bootstrap program in 1956.

At FSU he served in various administrative roles, particularly as the associate dean (1962) and dean (1962-1966) of its College of Arts and Sciences. After returning to the faculty in 1972, he wrote a book on Francis Beaumont and his works. He then was appointed provost of the university (1977-1980) under Bernard Sliger.

== Honors ==
After his death in an automobile accident on October 8, 1980 the university honored him by naming the University Distinguished Professor award after him, which is the highest honor awarded by the school in recognition of teaching, scholarship and service to the university. All previous recipients of the honor were retroactively re-named at that time. He received an honorary degree of L.H.D. from Wofford College in 1968–69.
