= Mark McPeek =

American biologist

Mark Alan McPeek is an American biologist focusing in evolutionary biology, community ecology, sexual selection, phylogenetic studies, adaptation, and population biology. He is currently the David T. McLaughlin Distinguished Professor of Biological Sciences at Dartmouth College. He was elected a Fellow of the Ecological Society of America in 2017.
