= Savannah hypothesis =

Evolutionary hypothesis

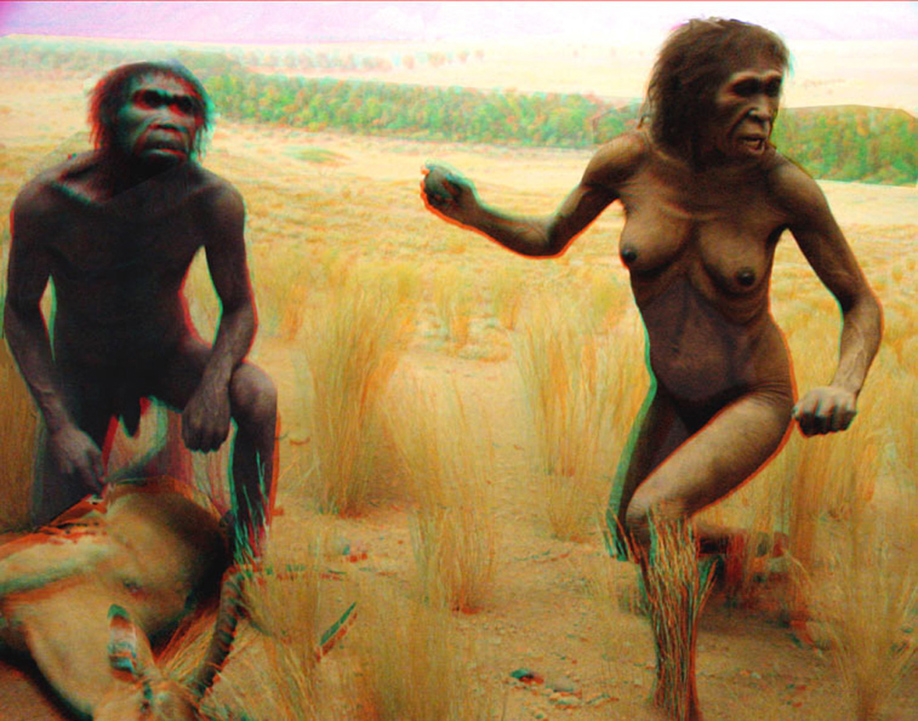
Australopithecus couple

The savannah hypothesis (or savanna hypothesis) is a hypothesis that human bipedalism evolved as a direct result of human ancestors' transition from an arboreal lifestyle to one on the savannas. According to the hypothesis, hominins left the woodlands that had previously been their natural habitat millions of years ago and adapted to their new habitat by walking upright.

The idea that a climate-driven retraction of tropical forests forced early hominini into bipedalism has been around for a long time, often implicitly. Some early authors saw savannahs as open grasslands, while others saw a mosaic of environments from woodlands to grasslands. The hypothesis has seen rising criticism since at least the late 1960s. The open grasslands version is mostly dismissed; in contrast, the mosaic version still has relatively wide support. However, the transition from forest to savanna probably was more gradual than previously thought.

== History ==
The fundamental ideas behind it date back to Lamarck, Darwin and Wallace. Also Gustav Steinmann saw reducing rain forest due to climate change as an important driver for bipedalism. Osborn thought man probably originated from the forests and flood-plains of southern Asia. Hilzheimer stated it was open landscapes that stimulated development.

The hypothesis first came to prominence however with the discovery of Australopithecus africanus by Raymond Dart in 1924. In an article on the discovery, published in the journal Nature, Dart wrote:

For the production of man a different apprenticeship was needed to sharpen the wits and quicken the higher manifestations of intellect—a more open veldt country where competition was keener between swiftness and stealth, and where adroitness of thinking and movement played a preponderating role in the preservation of the species. Darwin has said, "no country in the world abounds in a greater degree with dangerous beasts than Southern Africa." and, in my opinion, Southern Africa, by providing a vast open country with occasional wooded belts and a relative scarcity of water, together with a fierce and bitter mammalian competition, furnished a laboratory such as was essential to this penultimate phase of human evolution.

— Raymond Dart, Australopithecus Africanus: The Man-Ape of South Africa

Weinert stated apes are very reluctant to leave the safety of the trees, and the ancestors of modern man did not leave the trees, but the trees left them. Grabau echoed this by saying "Instead of the apes leaving the trees, the trees left the apes".

Not everyone agreed with this hypothesis, such as Weidenreich, but he did conclude it was a "widely spread belief".

The work of Robert Ardrey helped popularize the ideas that Dart had developed with a wide audience.

In the decades following Dart's discovery, more hominid fossils were found in Eastern and Southern Africa, leading researchers to conclude that these were savanna dwellers as well. Much of the academic discussion at the time took for granted that the transition to the savannas was responsible for the emergence of bipedalism, and focused instead on determining particular mechanisms by which this happened.

One of the proposed mechanisms was the knuckle-walking hypothesis; the claim that early human ancestors walked on all fours when they first emerged into the savannas. This was based on observations of morphological characteristics found in Australopithecus anamensis and Australopithecus afarensis, and posited that knuckle-walking was an example of convergent evolution in chimpanzees and gorillas, which was then lost by the genus Homo. Paleoanthropologists also posited that the upright posture would have been advantageous to savanna-dwelling hominids, as it allowed them to peer over tall grasses for predators, or in search of prey. P. E. Wheeler suggested that another advantage lay in reducing the amount of skin exposed to the sun, which helped regulate body temperatures. The turnover-pulse hypothesis, first described by Elizabeth Vrba seemed to support the savanna hypothesis by suggesting that climate change events resulting in the shrinking of forested areas forced animals out into the open grasslands.

Robinson investigated adaptive radiation for Australopithecus and saw grass savanna and other more arid environments expanding at this time, thus providing increased opportunity for animals capable of adapting to such conditions. Monod investigated the role in human evolution of the Sahara during wet periods as a place that was covered with steppes, savannas, and lakes. He saw advantages for the process of hominization in a wooded savanna.

In analogy with gelada Jolly proposed that "[i]n the basal hominid, therefore, the 'gelada' specialisations would be superimposed upon a behavioural repertoire and post-cranial structure already attuned to some degree of truncal erectness." The transition to bipedality would have been instigated by seed-eating and "probably took place in a dambo-like environment, later shifting to wider floodplains."

An early critic of the savanna hypothesis was Lovejoy in 1981. He stated "[i]t is more likely that hominids venturing into open habitats were already bipedal and that their regular occupation of savannahs was not possible until intensified social behavior was well developed."

Kortlandt sought the barrier required for geographic speciation to take place. According to him, the Great Rift Valley, the Nile and the Zambezi acted as a double barrier when a period of desiccation occurred in East Africa. This "must have converted the last-surviving dryopithecine (Proconsul) ape there into an upright-walking, drought-adapted, and 'humanoid' type of bush and grassland ape, i.e., in all probability the Homininae, strictly speaking." This corresponded with the location of some important fossils that had been found until then, such as in 1939 the Australopithecus afarensis in Laetoli by Ludwig Kohl-Larsen and the Paranthropus boisei in the Olduvai Gorge in 1959 by Mary Leakey. This Rift Valley theory became known as the East Side Story by Yves Coppens.

== Shifting consensus ==
In the latter parts of the 20th century, new fossil evidence began to emerge which called the savanna hypothesis into question. These newly-discovered remains showed indications that they were still well adapted to climbing trees, even after they had begun to walk upright. Both humans and chimpanzees tend to walk upright when moving along long branches of trees, increasing their reach.

In 1993, 4.4 million year old fossil teeth were found in Aramis, Ethiopia, by a group led by Tim D. White attributed to a new species, Australopithecus ramidus, later called Ardipithecus ramidus. The age was thus half a million years older than previously known A. afarensis and had a more monkey-like appearance. After extensive research, in 2009 in a series of eleven articles in Science, more was published about Ardi. It concluded that Ar. ramidus preferred more wooded areas instead of open grassland, which would not support the climate-driven savannah hypothesis.

A year later, these conclusions were questioned: "In contrast, we find the environmental context of Ar. ramidus at Aramis to be represented by what is commonly referred to as "tree or bush savanna" with 25% or less woody canopy cover. The habitats involved probably ranged from riparian forest to grassland."

For Phillip Tobias, the 1994 find of Little Foot, the collection of Australopithecus africanus foot bones demonstrating features consistent with tree-climbing as well as an upright gait, contributed to calling the savannah hypothesis obsolete, stating Open the window and throw out the savannah hypothesis; it's dead and we need a new paradigm.

In 2000 Brigitte Senut and Martin Pickford found the 6 million year old Orrorin tugenensis in Kenya. The skeleton seems to indicate both bipedalism and good climbing skills. The latter indicates a wooded environment, as does the discovery of black-and-white colobuses. The discovery of impalas points more towards a more open landscape. It later led Senut to the conclusion that the savannah hypothesis was no longer tenable. If these fossils are indeed early ancestors of modern man, then the environment of the later Australopithecus is less relevant.

In 2001 the seven-million-year-old Sahelanthropus tchadensis was discovered in Chad. Based on animal finds in the vicinity, this suggests a mosaic of environments from gallery forest at the edge of a lake area to a dominance of large savannah and grassland, although more research was needed to determine this precisely. The 5.6 million year old Ardipithecus kadabba discovered in 1997 was found in a similar terrain.

== Definition of savannah ==
Not everyone was willing to write off the savannah hypothesis. A poor definition of what a savannah actually is contributed to this. Critics of the hypothesis often saw the savannah as open grasslands with sporadic tree growth. However, savannas can have a high tree density and can also be humid. The big difference between savannas and forests is the lack of grasses in the latter. Thure E. Cerling developed a method to determine the forest cover of ancient landscapes, thus no longer requiring a definition of what a savannah is. By distinguishing between the C_{3} plants of the tropical forests and the mix of trees and C_{4} grasses of the savannah, they investigated the stable carbon isotope of paleosols from some sites in East Africa. They described landscapes varying from forest, woodland/bushland/shrubland, wooded grasslands to grasslands. They concluded that the early hominini lived in a more open environment than Australopithecus, rendering the savannah hypothesis still a plausible possibility.

Following on from Cerling, Manuel Domínguez-Rodrigo stated that the usual division of landscapes into grassy, wooded and wooded is of little use, because it tells nothing about the evolutionary pressure on mammals. For example, the selection pressure of grass fields in tropical forests is incomparable to the grasslands of savannas. Tropical forests also have many different species of trees, while savannas only have a few species, which hardly carry any fruit. Another factor is that of scale. Paleontologists often only investigate the site itself, an area of several hundred to thousands of meters. These habitats are referred to as biomes, yet, this latter term includes many hundreds of kilometres. According to Domínguez-Rodrigo, the savannah hypothesis can still give a good explanation, although the transition of environment has probably been less abrupt than some earlier authors thought.

== See also ==
- Aquatic ape hypothesis
- Endurance running hypothesis
- Recent African origin of modern humans
- Timeline of human evolution
