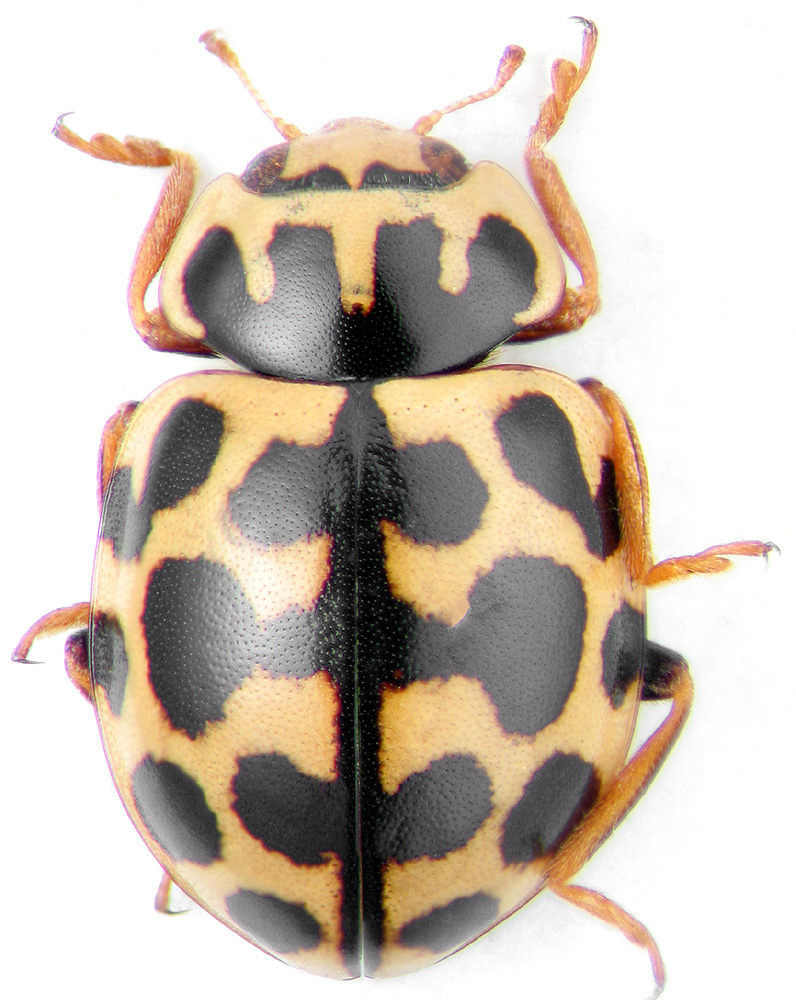
- Coccinula redimita

Scientific classification
- Kingdom: Animalia
- Phylum: Arthropoda
- Clade: Pancrustacea
- Class: Insecta
- Order: Coleoptera
- Suborder: Polyphaga
- Infraorder: Cucujiformia
- Family: Coccinellidae
- Subfamily: Coccinellinae
- Genus: Coccinula; Dobzhansky, 1925

= Coccinula =

Genus of beetles

Coccinula is a genus of ladybird beetles.

== Species ==
- Coccinula crotchi
- Coccinula elegantula
- Coccinula oresitropha
- Coccinula principalis
- Coccinula quatuordecimpustulata
- Coccinula redimita
- Coccinula sinensis
- Coccinula sinuatomarginata
