= Resource-use hypothesis =

Concept in evolution theory

The resource-use hypothesis is a macroevolutionary theory proposed by paleontologist Elisabeth S. Vrba as part of her broader Habitat Theory. It posits that the degree of ecological specialization—specifically in relation to biome occupancy—influences a lineage's propensity for speciation and extinction.

== Theory ==
Vrba's hypothesis suggests that specialist species (those restricted to a single climate zone or biome, often termed stenobiomic) are expected to have higher rates of both speciation and extinction compared to generalist species (eurybiomic species). This is because specialists are more vulnerable to environmental changes and vicariance events.

Vulnerability to environmental change: Specialists, due to their narrow ecological niche, are acutely sensitive to the expansion, contraction, and fragmentation of their specific habitat caused by primary climatic cycles (such as those of the Pleistocene). When their resource base fragments or disappears, their populations are divided, potentially leading to rapid speciation via allopatry or, more commonly, extinction.

Geographic distribution and fragmentation: The hypothesis further predicts a higher frequency of specialist species in biomes that are historically prone to a high degree of contraction and fragmentation during climatic cycles. These often correspond to zones at the extremes of global climatic gradients, such as equatorial rainforests and subtropical deserts, where shifting temperature and precipitation historically induced severe habitat fracturing.

Empirical studies on terrestrial mammals and other lineages have shown that the number of specialist species increases with historical regional climate fragmentation, offering support for this prediction. These studies have increasingly extended the corroboration of the resource-use hypothesis beyond its initial foundation in Neogene-Quaternary African ruminants. A key prediction —that the speciation rates of specialist species is significantly higher that in biome generalists— has been globally confirmed in several terrestrial groups, including ruminants, squirrels and butterflies. Another key prediction, stating that specialists should be more frequent than expected by chance, particularly in biomes at the extremes of the global climatic gradient, supporting the core principle that resource restriction in volatile environments drives higher specialization and turnover, has been corroborated in mammals, turtles and butterflies. These inter-taxonomic comparisons reinforce the view that resource-use patterns, driven by large-scale environmental change and subsequent habitat fragmentation, are a universal macroevolutionary force.

== Relationship to other hypotheses ==
The resource-use hypothesis is conceptually linked to Vrba's more widely known turnover-pulse hypothesis. Both ideas emphasize the role of large-scale physical environmental changes (especially climate change) as the primary external driver (or pacemaker) of bursts of macroevolutionary events (i.e., synchronized extinction and speciation events, or "pulses") across multiple co-existing lineages. The resource-use hypothesis provides a mechanism for how different species respond to these pulses, predicting that specialists will be the main drivers of the observed turnover. This ecological mechanism is also key to explaining the pattern of change described by Punctuated Equilibrium. Punctuated Equilibrium posits that species exhibit long periods of stasis (morphological stability) interrupted by rare, rapid bursts of change associated with speciation events (cladogenesis). Vrba's work, particularly her collaboration with Stephen Jay Gould and Niles Eldredge in developing a hierarchical model of evolution, links these sudden bursts to external environmental forces. Specifically, the resource-use hypothesis suggests that the fragmentation of a specialist's habitat during a major climatic pulse (the external trigger) drives the emergence of small, peripherally isolated populations—the very populations critical to the allopatric and peripatric speciation models underpinning Punctuated Equilibrium. Thus, the specialists' high vulnerability to resource partitioning due to climate change provides a direct causal link between global physical events and the rapid, branching pattern of evolution observed in the fossil record.
