= Bruce Wallace (geneticist) =

American geneticist (1920–2015)

- Born: 18 May 1920; McKean, Pennsylvania, U.S.
- Died: 12 January 2015 (aged 94); Blacksburg, Virginia, U.S.
- Education: Columbia University
- Scientific career
- Fields: Population genetics
- Workplaces: Cold Spring Harbor Laboratory; Cornell University; Virginia Tech
- Doctoral advisor: Theodosius Dobzhansky

Bruce Wallace (18 May 1920 – 12 January 2015) was an American scientist. He was University Distinguished Professor Emeritus of Biological Sciences at Virginia Tech.

== Biography ==
Wallace was born and raised in McKean, Pennsylvania. He received his bachelor's degree in zoology from Columbia University before joining the United States Army. He served as a statistical control officer under Robert McNamara before returning to Columbia to earn his doctoral degree in 1949, studying under Theodosius Dobzhansky. He joined the Cold Spring Harbor Laboratory in 1947 and was promoted to its assistant director. In 1958, he joined the faculty of Cornell University and held the position of professor of genetics until 1981 to become University Distinguished Professor of Biology at Virginia Tech. Wallace retired from teaching in 1994. His research has initially focused on the study of genetics and natural populations, but shifted towards environmental issues after his retirement.

Among his contributions to the field of biology was his conceptualization of an "island machine" to estimate the equilibrium number of species in the biogeography of a laboratory island and the major determinant of extinction. He also anticipated the structure and roles of enhancers in gene regulation.

Wallace was elected a member of the National Academy of Sciences in 1970. However, he resigned from the academy after learning that through its operating arm, the National Research Council, had committees doing secret war research funded by the United States Department of Defense during the Vietnam War. He was reinstated in the academy after the war was over.

He was also a member of the American Academy of Arts and Sciences. Wallace served as president of numerous learned societies, including the Genetics Society of America, the American Society of Naturalists, the Society for the Study of Evolution, and the American Genetics Association.

He died on 12 January 2015, in Blacksburg, Virginia, at age 94.
