= Yuri Filipchenko =

Russian entomologist (1882–1930)

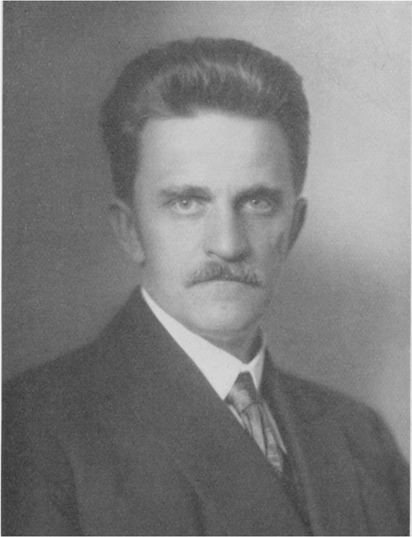
- Yuri Filipchenko
- Born: February 13, 1882; Zlyn’, Bolkhovsky District, Oryol Governorate, Russian Empire
- Died: May 19 or May 20, 1930 (aged 48); Leningrad, Russian SFSR, Soviet Union
- Citizenship: Russian
- Scientific career
- Fields: Genetics; Entomology; Eugenics; Zoology
- Institutions: Saint Petersburg State University
- Doctoral students: Theodosius Dobzhansky

Yuri Aleksandrovich Filipchenko, sometimes Philipchenko (Russian: Юрий Александрович Филипченко; 1882 — 1930) was a Russian entomologist who coined the terms microevolution and macroevolution, as well as the mentor of geneticist Theodosius Dobzhansky. Though he himself was an orthogeneticist, he was one of the first scientists to incorporate the laws of Mendel into evolutionary theory and thus had a great influence on The Modern Synthesis. He established a genetics laboratory in Leningrad undertaking experimental work with Drosophila melanogaster. Theodosius Dobzhansky worked with him from 1924. Filipchenko is also known for his work in Soviet eugenics, though his work in the subject would later result in his public denunciation due to the rise of Stalinism and increased criticisms that eugenics represented bourgeois science.

== Biography ==
=== Early life and education ===
Yuri Filipchenko was born on February 13, 1882, in Zlyn' in Bolkhovsky District of the Russian Empire. His father was Aleksandrovich Efimovich, a landowner and agriculturalist. Filipchenko also had a brother by the name of Aleksandr Aleksandrovich, who would later become a parasitologist and physician.

He received his secondary education at the Second Saint Petersburg Classical Gymnasium. In 1897, Filipchenko read Darwin’s On the Origin of Species and Sexual Selection for the first time. Two years later, he would read Carl Nägeli’s Mechanisch-physiologische Theorie der Abstamungslehre. These two works would later have a powerful formative influence on Filipchenko and helped to steer him towards a career in zoology.

Filipchenko graduated from Second Saint Petersburg in 1900, but due to a variety of financial difficulties that were further complicated by his father's death, he entered the Military Medical Academy. However, Filipchenko soon transferred to the natural science division at Saint Petersburg State University only a year after entering the academy.

Filipchenko was arrested in December 1905 due to being present at a meeting of the Soviet Workers' Deputies, but was released shortly afterwards. However, Filipchenko was arrested later the same month after helping to organize workers in the Nevsky District of Saint Petersburg, serving four months in prison during which he studied both philosophy and for government examinations. Though he would later join the Schlisselburg Committee, which assisted with the plight of political prisoners, and the Socialist Revolutionary Party, Filipchenko stepped away from politics after 1906 to focus his attention on scientific pursuits.

After graduating from Saint Petersburg State University's Zoology Department in 1906, Filipchenko was accepted to Saint Petersburg State University's Zoology and Comparative Anatomy Master's program in 1910. He pursued comparative embryology for his candidate's thesis due to his interest in the presentation and evolution of physical characteristics in animals. By engaging in a project that allowed him to compare the embryonic development in higher-level taxa (i.e. class, orders, etc.), Filipchenko gained a broader perspective on inheritance that would later inform his ideas on macroevolution.

=== Career ===
Filipchenko created the first department of genetics in Russia at Saint Petersburg State University in 1919, which would, by 1921, become the Bureau of Eugenics at the Russian Academy of Sciences in Saint Petersburg. In later years, the Bureau would be renamed the Bureau of Genetics and Eugenics in 1925 and finally the Laboratory of Genetics in 1930, but regardless of its name, the work of the institution would go on to form the foundation of the Institute of Genetics at the USSR Academy of Science.

However, in the wake of the first five-year plan, Filipchenko became publicly castigated for his work in orthogenesis and in eugenics and was relieved of his position at Saint Petersburg State University in 1930. His Laboratory of Genetics and Experimental Zoology was disbanded shortly afterward.

=== Personal life ===
Filipchenko was married to Nadezhda Pavlovna, with whom he had a son by the name of Gleb, who was a physicist. Both Nadezhda and Gleb were killed during the blockade of Leningrad in World War II.

=== Death ===
Filipchenko developed a severe headache whilst working at Peterhof, and concerned about his health, traveled to Leningrad to be taken care of by his brother Aleksandr. While in Leningrad, Filipchenko contracted streptococcal meningitis and later died at midnight between May 19 and May 20, 1930. His head was donated to Bekhterev’s Brain Institute for research, while the rest of his remains were buried in Smolensky Cemetery.

== Scientific career ==
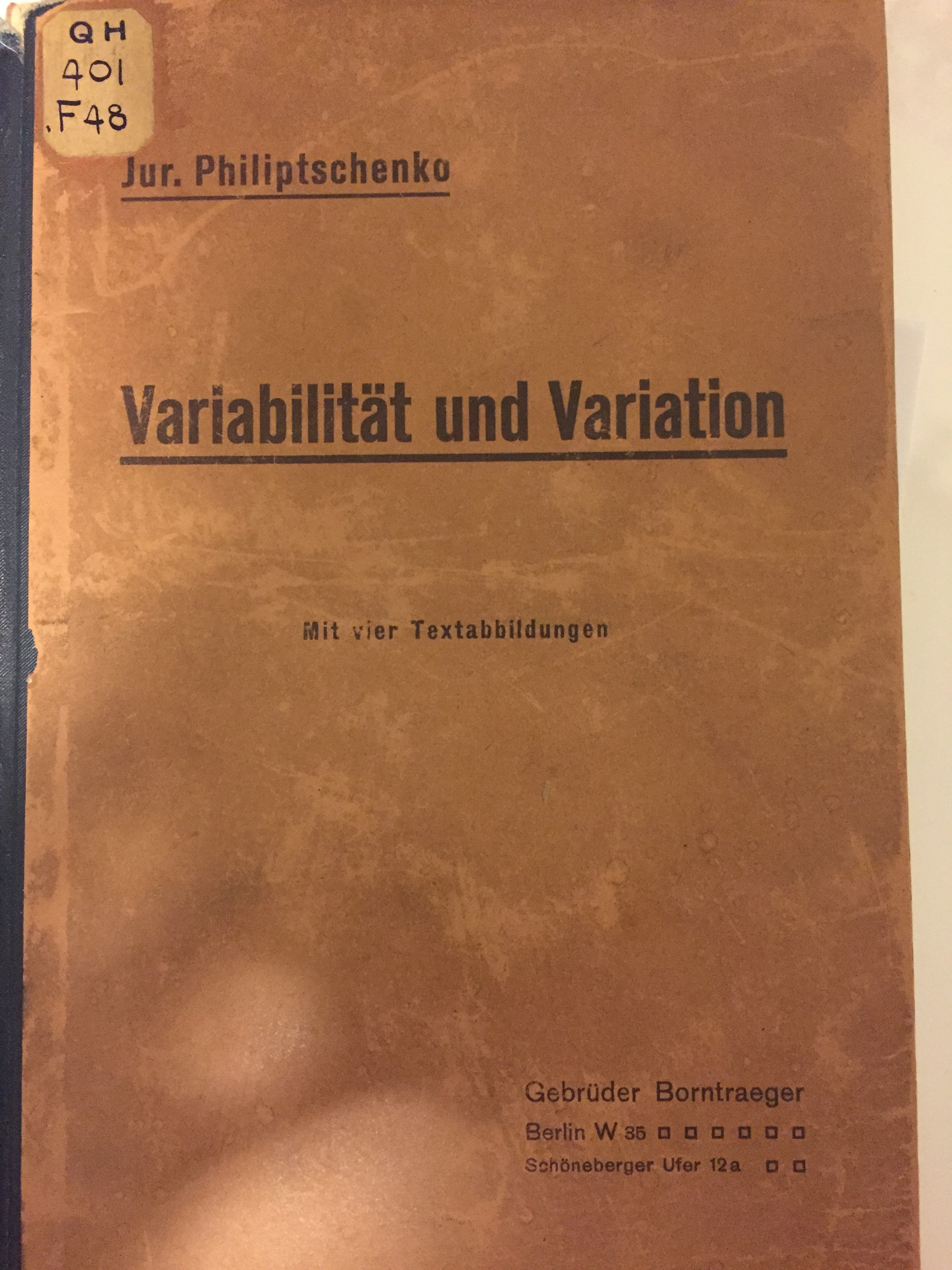
The front cover of one copy of Filipchenko's Variabilität und Variation (copy of text taken from the Regenstein Library at the University of Chicago)

=== Variabilität und Variation ===
In his 1927 German text Variabilität und Variation, Filipchenko introduced the idea of two separate forms of evolution: evolution within a species, or microevolution, and evolution that occurs in higher taxonomic categories, which he termed macroevolution. While microevolution was governed by a system of inheritance dictated by genetics, Filipchenko based macroevolution on cytoplasmic variability rather than genetic inheritance.

== Views on Darwin ==
Though evolution was embraced by many Russian biologists in Filipchenko's day, there did exist elements of opposition to Darwin's ideas, most commonly in the form of "direct evolution," or orthogenesis. While Filipchenko self-identified as a Darwinist, he only did so in the sense that he believed in the idea of evolution. He did not subscribe to the belief that Darwin's concept of natural selection was as integral to the process of evolution as Darwin espoused, instead positing that evolution was not governed by the principles of Lamarck or natural selection, but rather was intrinsic to life itself. Filipchenko believed that evolution in animals and plants was an inherent developmental process rather than a change induced over successive generations, a process that an organism's environment can affect, but only indirectly.

== Involvement in Eugenics ==
Filipchenko's investigations into genetics, craniometry, the inheritance of quantitative characters, and neurology eventually introduced him to ideas on eugenics that were being developed by his contemporaries in the United States and Europe. These ideas on eugenics proved so powerful to Filipchenko that he himself began to write papers and give lectures on the subject in 1918. Filipchenko would later go on to form the Russian Eugenics Society in Moscow in 1920, as well as the Bureau of Eugenics in February 1921, an independent eugenics research institution in Petrograd. Ultimately, Filipchenko, along with Nikolai Koltsov, would become the main leaders of the Russian eugenics movement.

Filipchenko was drawn to eugenics due to both its potential to be used as a "civic religion" and its promise of a better future for the Soviets, but also due to the immense amount of funding directed towards eugenics due to the Soviet government's interest in the subject. Eugenics seemed to be the practical application of genetics relative to human health, and since this fact dovetailed with the Soviet penchant for scientific social planning, and so Soviet institutions like the Commissariat of Public Health poured funding into the subject.

Filipchenko and his Bureau of Eugenics created charts of the pedigrees of various Soviet academics and intellectuals in an attempt to ascertain the location of "race" within an individual. But Filipchenko was staunchly against Bolshevik ideas regarding the sterilization of undesirables and mass insemination of women by men with exceptional genetics, stating that such acts were "crude assaults on the human person" and that the best way to create a "desirable breed" was through positive selection. In Filipchenko's eyes, eugenic progress could only be achieved through education rather than legislative or scientific methods.

However, by 1925, the appeal of Soviet eugenics had waned due to issues outside of just the negative aspects of the subject. A great controversy arose regarding the compatibility of genetics, and by extension eugenics, with Marxist science. Filipchenko, in an attempt to defend eugenics’ relevance to Marxist dialectic, argued against Lamarckism, the other theory on inheritance that some Soviet scientists had argued was more compatible with the tenets of Marxism, by stating that if it were true, then the negative qualities that Lamarckism associated with poverty and the lower class would have prevented them from rising up against the bourgeoisie in the first place.

Despite eugenics surviving the conflict between genetics and Lamarckism, Filipchenko's work in eugenics was effectively cut short with the emergence of the Great Break (USSR) in 1929. During this period, eugenics was referred to as a “bourgeois doctrine,” and as such the USSR would become the first country to officially ban the subject. Filipchenko's work in the subject would later be one of the key reasons for his dismissal from Saint Petersburg in 1930.

== Impact ==
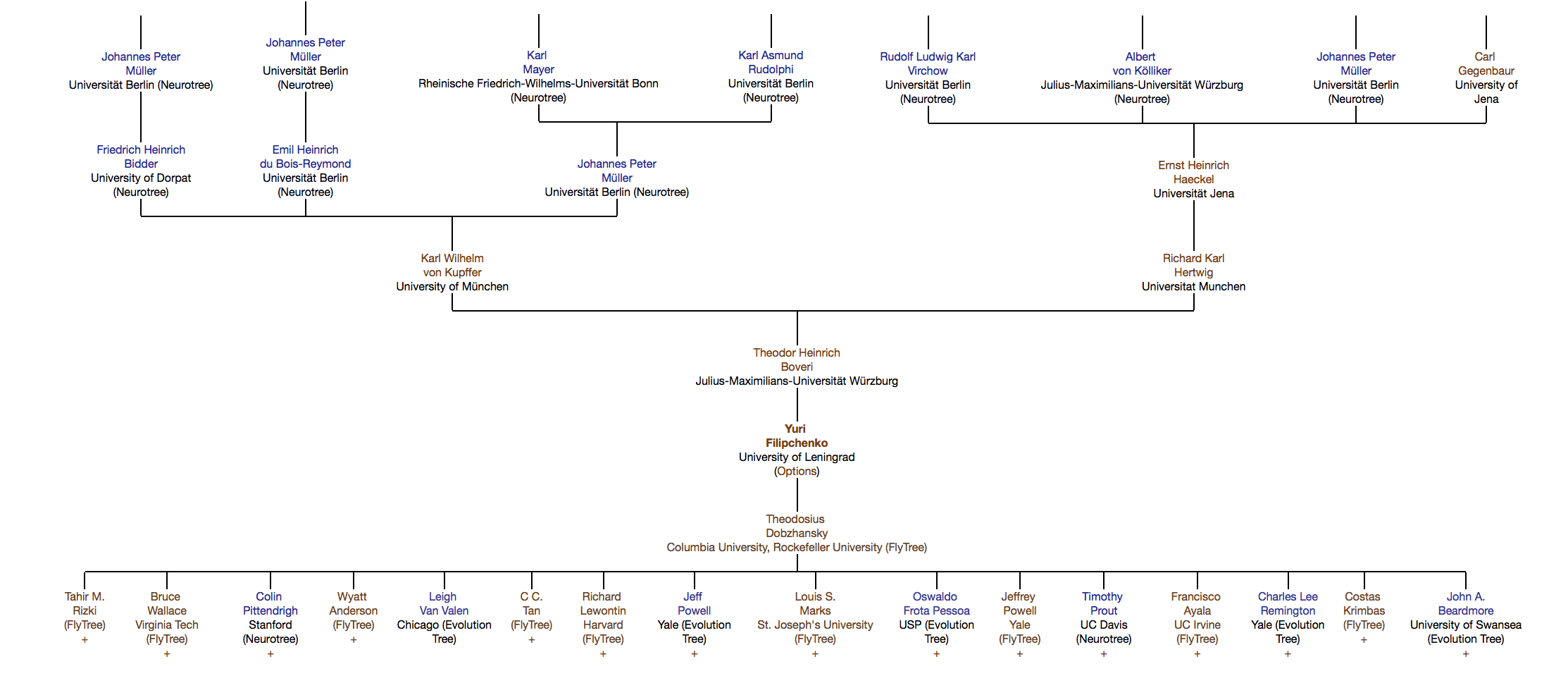
This academic genealogy tree generated by academictree.org denotes the individuals in Russian academia who inspired Filipchenko, as well as those who were inspired (directly or indirectly) by Filipchenko himself

Filipchenko was the first professor in Russia to introduce genetics at the collegiate level due to his annual course on inheritance at Petersburg University, which he started teaching in 1913. He was also the first to publish a textbook on the subject of inheritance and genetics in Russia, which was called Nasledstvennost'. His articles and textbooks on inheritance were some of the first entry points for Russian biologists like Dobzhansky to modern genetics, and it is for this reason that Soviet botanist and historian Peter Zhukovsky once called Filipchenko "the teacher of our youth."

== Published works ==
During his career, Filipchenko published more than 100 works in Russian, 20 works in German, and 4 works in French, often under the name "J.A. Philiptschenko." Below are a few of the articles he put out in his lifetime.

- Razvitie izotomy (The development of isotomes; St. Petersburg, 1912)
- Izmenchivost’ i evoliutsiia (Variation and evolution; Petrograd and Moscow, 1915; 2nd ed., Petersburg, 1921)
- Proiskhozhdenie domashnykh zhivotnykh (The origin of domesticated animals; Petrograd, 1916; 2nd ed., Leningrad, 1924)
- Nasledstvennost’ (Heredity; Moscow, 1917; 2nd ed., 1924; 3rd ed., 1926)
- Chto takoe evgenika? (What is eugenics?; Petrograd. 1921)
- Kak nasleduetsia razlichnye osobennosti cheloveka (How various human traits are inherited; Petrograd, 1921)
- Izmenchivost i metody ee izucheniia (Variation and methods for its study: Petrograd, 1923;2nd ed. Leningrad 1926; 3rd ed., 1927; 4th ed., Moscow and Leningrad 1929)
- Obshchedostupnaia biologiia (Biology for the general reader; Petrograd, 1923; 15th ed., 1930)
- Evoliutsionnaia ideia v biologii (The evolutionary idea in biology; Moscow, 1923; 2nd ed., 1926; 3rd ed., 1977)
- Puti uluchsheniia chelovecheskogo roda (evgenika) (Ways of improving the human race [eugenics]; Leningrad, 1924)
- "Frensis Gal’ton i Gregor Mendel” (Francis Galton and Gregor Mendel; Moscow, 1925)
- Besedy o zhivykh sushchestvakh (Conversations about living substances; Leningrad, 1925)
- Nasledstvenny li priobretennye priznaki? (Are acquired characteristics inherited?: Leningrad. 1925)
- Variabilitat und variation (Berlin, 1927)
- I, Rasteniia (Plants; Leningrad, 1927)
- II, Zhivotnye (Animals; Leningrad, 1928)
- Genetika i ee znachenie dlia zhivotnovodstva (Genetics and its significance for animal breeding; Moscow and Leningrad, 1931)
- Eksperimental naia zoologiia (Experimental zoology; Leningrad and Moscow, 1932)
- Genetika Miagkikh pshenits (The genetics of soft wheats; Moscow and Leningrad, 1934)
