= Elisabeth Vrba =

American paleontologist (1942–2025)

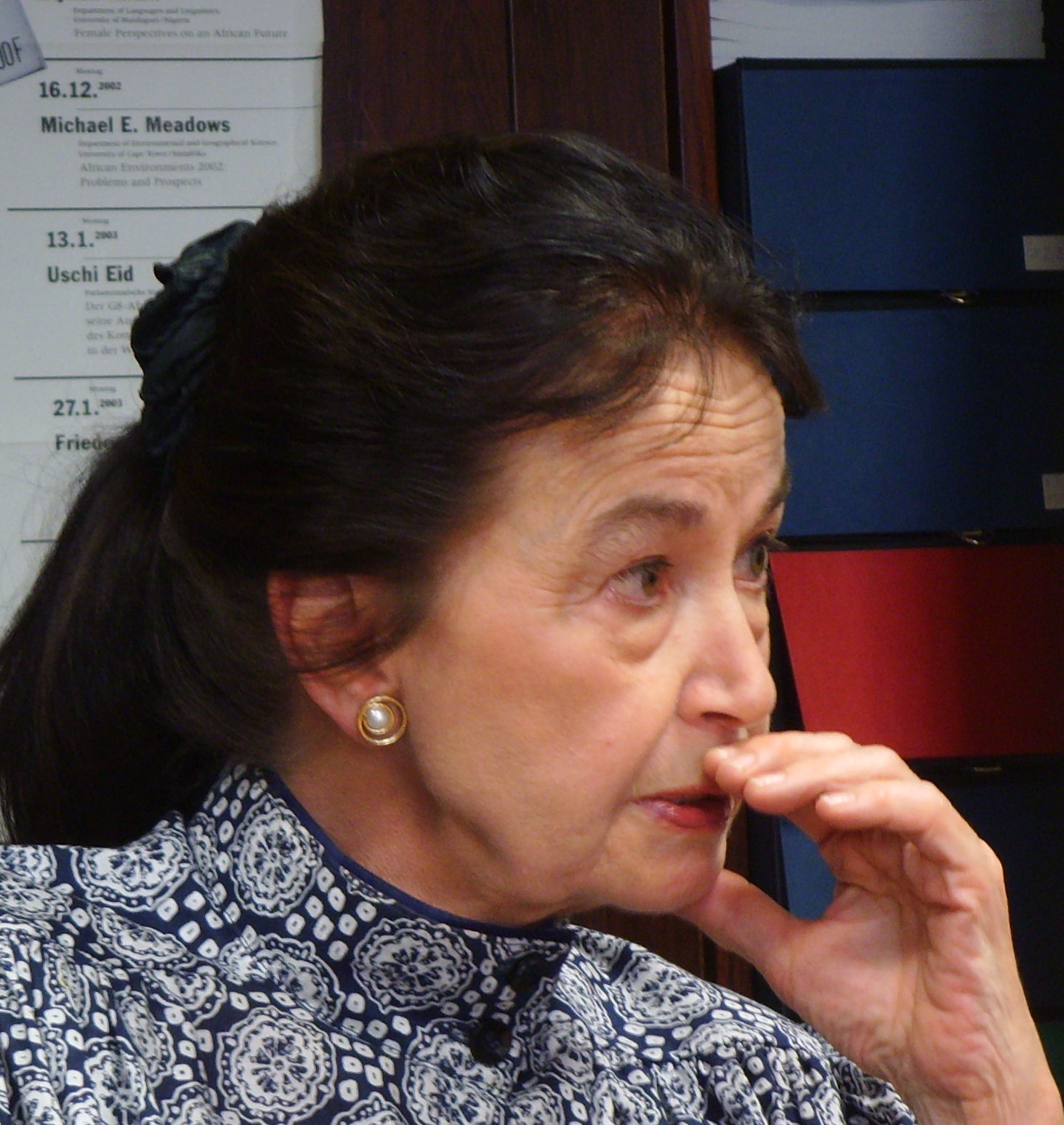
- Vrba in 2009
- Born: May 27, 1942; Hamburg, Germany
- Died: February 5, 2025 (aged 82); New Haven, Connecticut, U.S.
- Education: University of Cape Town
- Scientific career
- Fields: Paleontology
- Workplaces: Yale University

Elisabeth S. Vrba (May 27, 1942 – February 5, 2025) was an American paleontologist at Yale University who developed the turnover-pulse hypothesis which suggests that major changes to the climate or ecosystem often result in a period of rapid extinction and high turnover of new species (a "pulse") across multiple different lineages. Together with Stephen J. Gould, they developed the term exaptation to describe a trait that performs a function but originally evolved for a completely different purpose.

== Background ==
Vrba was born in Hamburg, Germany. In 1944, following the death of her father, she moved with her family to a sheep farm in Namibia. She earned her Ph.D. in Zoology and Palaeontology at the University of Cape Town, in 1974. Vrba studied zoology and mathematical statistics at the University of Cape Town to earn her undergraduate degree. She remained there for doctoral study in zoology and paleontology to earn her Ph.D. After receiving her doctorate, Vrba conducted her early research on African fossil records over the last several million years, tracking the sequence of fossils from analyzing the geological strata and analyzing the morphology of the fossils. She was the chief assistant to Charles Kimberlin Brain during his directorship of the Transvaal Museum.

Vrba died in New Haven, Connecticut, on February 5, 2025, at the age of 82.

== Career ==
Vrba was appointed a professor at the Department of Geology & Geophysics, Yale University, in 1986 and retired in 2014. She is well known for developing the turnover-pulse hypothesis, as well as coining the word exaptation with colleague Stephen Jay Gould. Her specific interest was in the Family Bovidae (antelopes, etc.), but her students studied a wide range of species.

== Innovations ==
Vrba and colleague Stephen Jay Gould are renowned for having proposed the term exaptation. Vrba and Gould's research suggested that the historical origin of a genetic or morphological trait is not always reflective of its contemporary function — genesis and current function should not be conflated. Genetic or morphological adaptations may take on new functions and may serve a species a different purpose further on in evolution. Gould died in 2002, but their coined term has been widely referenced in recent years in popular science writing. Vrba and Gould's idea of exaptation has also been criticized in recent years by scholars who assert that genetic traits are pressured by multiple factors, making it challenging to determine when adaptation or exaptation is at play.

Vrba also constructed the Turnover-pulse hypothesis and the Resource-use hypothesis as part of her Habitat Theory, a significant addition to macroevolutionary theory.

== Selected publications ==
- Gould, S. J. and E. S. Vrba. (1982). "Exaptation—a missing term in the science of form." Paleobiology 8: 4-15.
- Katherine MacInnes. "Evolving Vocabulary: the rise and fall of 'exaptation'" International Innovation, September 18, 2015, https://web.archive.org/web/20160825224345/http://www.internationalinnovation.com/evolving-vocabulary-the-rise-and-fall-of-exaptation/.
- Lewis, R. "Surveying the Genomic Landscape of Modern Mammals," DNA Science Blog, January 29, 2015. http://blogs.plos.org/dnascience/2015/01/29/probing-genomic-landscape-modern-mammals/.
- Michael Garfield. "Exaptation of the Guitar" Guitar International, September 17, 2010, https://web.archive.org/web/20130622042448/http://guitarinternational.com/2010/09/17/exaptation-of-the-guitar/.
- Rozzi, Roberto. "Elisabeth Vrba | TrowelBlazers." trowelblazers.com. 2014. Accessed October 17, 2015. http://trowelblazers.com/elisabeth-vrba/.
- Shapiro, J. "More Evidence on the Real Nature of Evolutionary DNA Change," Huffington Post, The Blog, June 1, 2012. http://www.huffingtonpost.com/james-a-shapiro/more-evidence-on-the-real_b_1158228.html.
- Shell, E. R. (1999). "Waves of Creation." Discover 14 (May): 54-61.
- Vrba, E. S. and Gould, S. J. (1986). "The hierarchical expansion of sorting and selection." Paleobiology. 12 (2): 217-228. doi:10.1017/S0094837300013671
- Vrba, E. S. (1993). "The Pulse That Produced Us." Natural History 102 (5) 47-51.
