= Turnover-pulse hypothesis =

Concept in evolution theory

The turnover-pulse hypothesis, formulated by paleontologist Elisabeth Vrba as part of her broader Habitat Theory, suggests that major changes to the climate or ecosystem often result in a period of rapid extinction and high turnover of new species (a "pulse") across multiple different lineages. Changes may include climate change, tectonic plate shifting, and catastrophes, among other things. It can be seen as an extension of the concept of evolutionary radiation from a single to a multi-clade context.

== Theory ==
Ecosystems periodically experience significant disruptions which cause mass extinctions and speciation. Vrba proposes that changes in the climate, through their effect on the physical environment, result in the "division of [animal] populations into geographically and genetically isolated groups", which subsequently evolve into separate species. She also predicts that within an ecosystem this should occur for different groups of animals at roughly the same time, creating a "synchronous pulse" across multiple lineages.

The hypothesis was developed to explain the different patterns of evolution seen in African antelopes. Vrba argued that the mammalian fauna of East Africa experienced a rapid burst of extinction and speciation between 2.8Ma and 2.5Ma, caused by a large fluctuation in temperature. During this event, so the hypothesis states, many species attempted to move from their now uninhabitable habitats and later developed different adaptations in their new environments, evolving into different species, such as the antelopes investigated by Vrba, which evolved from woodland browsers to grassland grazers. Vrba's support for the idea that different clades would all adapt synchronously and alongside climate events came from the fossil record of rodents from the Omo river valley.

=== Hominins ===
Vrba later proposed these changes as the spark for the emergence of the Homo lineage, as distinct from other hominins, which is dated to around this time. This aligns with the savannah hypothesis (or "aridity hypothesis"), which suggests that increasing aridity led to the growth and expansion of the savannah, requiring the hominins to come down from the trees and walk on two legs. The earliest archaeological sites containing tools also date to this period. However, it is still possible that the genus Homo had already evolved before the climate event.

=== Rodents ===
A study examining rodent assemblages from the Iberian Plio-Pleistocene (5.25 to 0.01 Ma) found results consistent with the Turnover-pulse hypothesis. Researchers identified a significant inflection point in ecological specialization concurrent with the onset of Northern Hemisphere glaciations around 2.75 Ma. After important species loss, likely due to progressive global cooling, the Pliocene saw a transitional period where generalist species became predominant. Following the critical climatic pulse at 2.75 Ma, the rodent communities underwent a reorganization marked by a progressive increase in ecological specialization. This post-pulse specialization trend was primarily driven by the adaptive radiation of Arvicolinae into highly specialized taxa during the Pleistocene, demonstrating that major climatic shifts trigger faunal turnover events. This work also shows empirically the connections between the Turnover-pulse hypothesis and the Resource-use hypothesis.

== Criticism ==
The main opposing viewpoint is the Red Queen hypothesis, proposed by Leigh Van Valen, which holds that extinction occurs in a constant turnover, instead of pulses.

Studies on fossils from Turkana basin at the time of the conjectured dramatic shift 2.5 million years ago found that the rate of adaptation was significantly less than had been predicted by the turnover-pulse hypothesis, with a 50% to 60% species turnover spread over 1 million years instead of a 90% turnover in a few hundred thousand. Suggested explanations for the discrepancy include that "variations in fossil abundance through time skewed Vrba's data, creating a false peak" or that the "Turkana rift valley—which held a river bounded by woodland at this time—was buffered from the dramatic climatic shifts".

A change to a cooler, dryer climate at some point between 2.8Ma and 2.5Ma is widely accepted (and corroborated by the composition of sediment layers on the seafloor), but peaks of adaptation among different species in East Africa have been noted at different times, meaning that though "large-mammal evidence is consistent with the idea of a faunal change in the late Pliocene, [...] there is currently no agreement about its extent and precise date."

While there is a consensus that major climatic events cause widespread extinction, other studies of East Africa and other regions have failed to identify any pulse-like events resulting in synchronous evolution or speciation, and this likely relies on local conditions.
