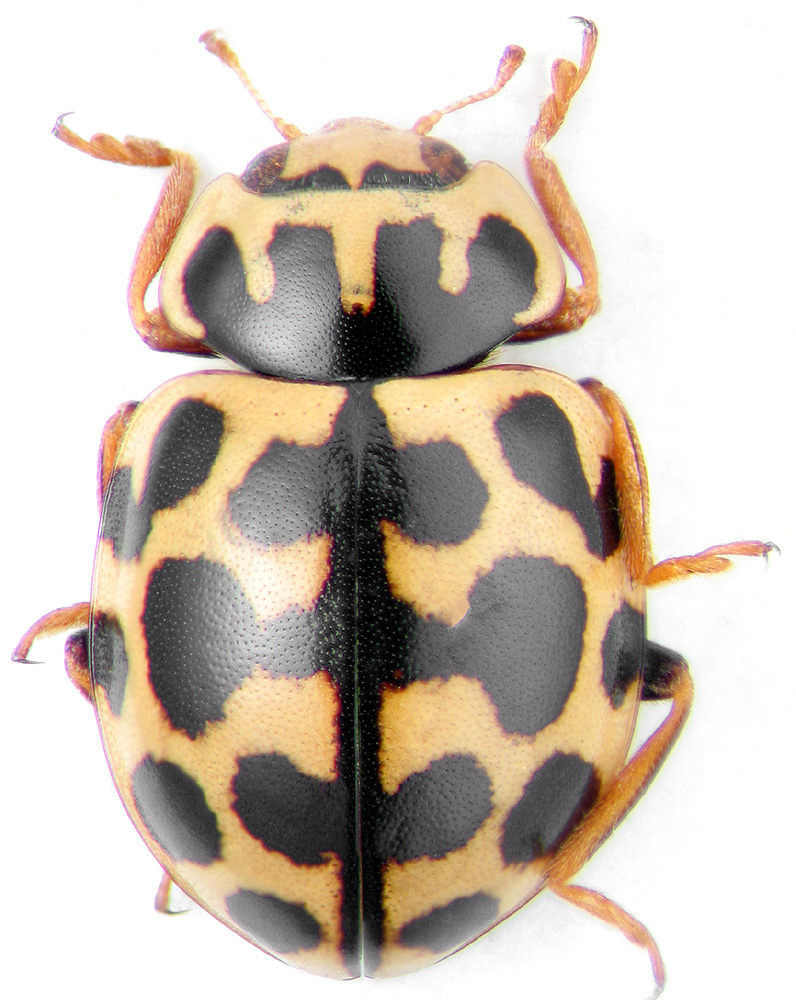

Scientific classification
- Kingdom: Animalia
- Phylum: Arthropoda
- Clade: Pancrustacea
- Class: Insecta
- Order: Coleoptera
- Suborder: Polyphaga
- Infraorder: Cucujiformia
- Family: Coccinellidae
- Genus: Coccinula
- Species: C. redimita

Binomial name
- Coccinula redimita (Weise, 1885)

Synonyms
- Coccinella redimita Weise, 1885

= Coccinula redimita =

Species of beetle

Coccinula redimita is a species of beetle of the family Coccinellidae. It is found in Pakistan, Iran, Afghanistan and the Palaearctic.

== Description ==
Adults reach a length of about 4.5 mm (0.18 in). They have a broadly rounded body, with the dorsal surface convex and glabrous. The pattern on the elytra is variable.
