= Macroevolution =

Evolution on a scale at or above the level of species

Macroevolution comprises the evolutionary processes and patterns which occur at and above the species level. In contrast, microevolution is evolution occurring within the population(s) of a single species. In other words, microevolution is the scale of evolution that is limited to intraspecific (within-species) variation, while macroevolution extends to interspecific (between-species) variation. The evolution of new species (speciation) is an example of macroevolution. This is the common definition for 'macroevolution' used by contemporary scientists. (Note: Rolland et al. (2023) in the introduction describe 'microevolution' and 'macroevolution' occurring at two different scales; below the species level and at/above the species level respectively: "Since the modern synthesis, many evolutionary biologists have focused their attention on evolution at one of two different timescales: microevolution, that is, the evolution of populations below the species level (in fields such as population genetics, phylogeography and quantitative genetics), or macroevolution, that is, the evolution of species or higher taxonomic levels (for example, phylogenetics, palaeobiology and biogeography).") (Note: Saupe & Myers (2021) states: "Macroevolution is the study of patterns and processes associated with evolutionary change at and above the species level, and includes investigations of both evolutionary tempo and mode.") (Note: Michael Hautmann (2019) discusses 3 categories of definitions that have been historically used. He argues in favor of the following definition [added clarity]: "Macroevolution is evolutionary change that is guided by sorting of interspecific [between-species] variation.") (Note: David Jablonski (2017) states: "Macroevolution, defined broadly as evolution above the species level, is thriving as a field.") (Note: In his book "The Structure of Evolutionary Theory" (2002) page 612, Stephen J. Gould describes the species as the basic unit of macroevolution, and compares speciation and extinction to birth and death in microevolutionary processes respectively: "In particular, and continuing to use species as a "type" example of individuality at higher levels, all evolutionary criteria apply to the species as a basic unit of macro-evolution. Species have children by branching (in our professional jargon, we even engender these offspring as "daughter species"). Speciation surely obeys principles of hereditary, for daughters, by strong constraints of homology, originate with phenotypes and genotypes closer to those of their parent than to any other species of a collateral lineage. Species certainly vary, for the defining property of reproductive isolation demands genetic differentiation from parents and collateral relatives. Finally, species interact with the environment in a causal way that can influence rates of birth (speciation) and death (extinction).") (Note: In his paper proposing the theory of species selection, Steven M. Stanly (1974) described macroevolution as being evolution above the species level and decoupled from microevolution: "In reaction to the arguments of macromutationists who opposed Neo-Darwinism, modern evolutionists have forcefully asserted that the process of natural selection is responsible for both microevolution, or evolution within species, and evolution above the species level, which is also known as macroevolution or transpecific evolution. [...] Macroevolution is decoupled from microevolution, and we must envision the process governing its course as being analogous to natural selection but operating at a higher level of biological organization. In this higher-level process species become analogous to individuals, and speciation replaces reproduction") (Note: The 'Understanding Evolution' website by UCMP: "Microevolution happens on a small scale (within a single population), while macroevolution happens on a scale that transcends the boundaries of a single species") (Note: Thomas Holtz's course GEOL331 lecture notes discusses macroevolution observed in the fossil record:"Following these early attempted modifications of Darwinism, the rest of the 20th Century onward stayed largely within a Darwinian model. However, there were different major schools of thought. Many of these differences hinged on views of microevolution (evolutionary change within a species) and macroevolution (evolutionary change above the species level). While most agreed that the ultimate processes in macroevolution were ultimately microevolutionary, there were disagreement[s] whether the patterns produced were actually reducible to microevolutionary changes.") (Note: The 'Digital Atlas of Ancient Life' website by PRI provides a very detailed historical overview for the definition of 'macroevolution': "The meaning of the term "macroevolution" has shifted over time. Indeed, early definitions do to not necessarily make much sense in light of our current understanding of evolution, yet are still worth considering to show how the field itself has evolved. Here we will consider usage of the term macroevolution in a few key works, as well as present a definition of macroevolution that we endorse. [...] Lieberman and Eldredge (2014) defined macroevolution as "the patterns and processes pertaining to the birth, death, and persistence of species" and we adopt this definition here.") However, the exact usage of the term has varied throughout history.

Macroevolution addresses the evolution of species and higher taxonomic groups (genera, families, orders, etc) and uses evidence from phylogenetics, the fossil record, and molecular biology to answer how different taxonomic groups exhibit different species diversity and/or morphological disparity.

== Origin and changing meaning of the term ==
After Charles Darwin published his book On the Origin of Species in 1859, evolution was widely accepted to be a real phenomenon. However, many scientists still disagreed with Darwin that natural selection was the primary mechanism to explain evolution. Prior to the modern synthesis, during the period between the 1880s to the 1930s (dubbed the 'Eclipse of Darwinism') many scientists argued in favor of alternative explanations. These included 'orthogenesis', and among its proponents was the Russian entomologist Yuri A. Filipchenko.

Filipchenko appears to have been the one who coined the term 'macroevolution' in his book Variabilität und Variation (1927). While introducing the concept, he claimed that the field of genetics is insufficient to explain "the origin of higher systematic units" above the species level.

Auf die Weise hebt die heutige Genetik zweifellos den Schleier von der Evolution der Biotypen, Jordanone und Linneone (eine Art Mikroevolution), dagegen jene Evolution der höheren systematischen Gruppen, welche von jeher die Geister besonders für sich in Anspruch genommen hat (eine Art Makroevolution), liegt gänzlich außerhalb ihres Gesichtsfeldes, und dieser Umstand scheint uns die von uns oben angeführten Erwägungen über das Fehlen einer inneren Beziehung zwischen der Genetik und der Deszendenzlehre, die sich ja hauptsächlich mit der Makroevolution befaßt, nur zu unterstreichen. Bei einer solchen Sachlage muß zugegeben werden, daß die Entscheidung der Frage über die Faktoren der größeren Züge der Evolution, d. h. dessen, was wir Makroevolution nennen, unabhängig von den Ergebnissen der gegenwärtigen Genetik geschehen muß. So vorteilhaft es für uns auch wäre, uns auch in dieser Frage auf die exakten Resultate der Genetik zu stützen, so sind sie doch, unserer Meinung nach, zu diesem Zweck ganz unbrauchbar, da die Frage über die Entstehung der höheren systematischen Einheiten ganz außerhalb des Forschungsgebietes der Genetik liegt. Infolgedessen ist letztere auch eine exakte Wissenschaft, während die Dezendenzlehre heute, ebenso wie auch in XIX. Jahrhundert, einen einen spekulativen Charakter trägt.
In this way, modern genetics undoubtedly lifts the veil from the evolution of biotypes, Jordanones and Linneones [i.e. variations within a species] (Note: The terms ('biotypes', 'Jordanone', and 'Linneone') used here by Filipchenko were/are rarely used among non-Russian speaking scientists. According to Krasil'nikov (1958), these terms were used to describe the variety of forms observed within a single species: "With the development of genetics the concept of species widened according to the ideas of variability and heredity of organisms. New terms were introduced for the determination of species subdivision, such as "biotype", "pure line", "jardanon", "linneon", etc. ["Jardanon"--a simple means of classification of lower organisms. "Linneon"--the complex of "jardanons"--according to the Russian concept, the inner species variety of forms does not exceed the limits of qualitative unity of the species.]") (a kind of microevolution), but that evolution of the higher systematic groups, which has always particularly occupied the minds of men (a kind of macroevolution), lies entirely outside its field of vision, and this circumstance seems to us only to emphasize the considerations we have given above about the lack of an inner relationship between genetics and the theory of descent, which is mainly concerned with macroevolution. In such a state of affairs, it must be admitted that the decision of the question depends on the factors of the larger features of evolution, of what we call macroevolution, must occur independently of the results of current genetics. As advantageous as it would be for us to rely on the exact results of genetics in this question, they are, in our opinion, completely useless for this purpose, since the question about the origin of the higher systematic units lies entirely outside the field research area of genetics. As a result, the latter is also an exact science, while the doctrine of descent today, as well as in the 19th century, has a speculative character.

— Yuri Filipchenko, Variabilität und Variation (1927), pages 93-94

Filipchenko's also claimed that a new taxon cannot evolve from an older one with a lower rank; e.g. a species cannot evolve into a family. It must originate from a preceding family. Furthermore, the evolution of a new family must require the sudden appearance of new traits which are different in greater magnitude compared to the new traits required for the evolution of a genus or species.

Hier scheint uns ein wesentliches Mißverständnis obzuwalten. Davon schon gar nicht zu reden, daß es kaum richtig ist, in den Jardanonen Spaltungsprodukte eines Linneone zu sehen, ist es noch unrichtiger anzunehmen, daß nach den heutigen Anschauungen ein Jordanon sich im Evolutionsprozeß in ein neues Linneon verwandeln kann oder muß. Im Gegenteil, uns scheint, daß sich bei der Evolution die verschiedenen taxonomischen Einheiten so verhalten, daß Gleiches Gleiches erzeugt. Aus einem Biotyp entsteht durch Mutation ein neuer Biotypus, aus einem Jordanon bildet sich - durch eine Neugruppierung der ihn bildenden Biotypen, sowie durch das Auftreten einiger neuer - ein zweites Jordanon; endlich zerfällt ein aus mehreren Jordanonen bestehendes Linneon infolge des Verschwindens einiger von ihnen in zwei selbständige Linneone. Es ist vollkommen richtig, daß niemand eine Umwandlung der Rassen in eine Art beobachtet hat, aber das braucht auch nicht zu sein, da im Prozeß der Evolution eine neue Art oder Arten gewöhnlich aus einer alten Art, eine neue Gattung aus einer anderen Gattung usw. entstehen.
There seems to be a fundamental misunderstanding here. Not to mention that it is hardly correct to see the Jardanones as products of the fission of a Linneone, it is even more incorrect to assume that, according to modern views, a Jordanone can or must transform into a new Linneone in the process of evolution. On the contrary, it seems to us that in evolution the various taxonomic units behave in such a way that like produces like. A new biotype arises from one biotype through mutation; a Jordanone forms a second Jordanone through a regrouping of the biotypes that make up it and the appearance of some new ones; finally, a Linneone consisting of several Jordanones splits into two independent Linneones as a result of the disappearance of some of them. It is quite true that no one has observed a transformation of the races into a species, but that need not be the case, since in the process of evolution a new species or species usually arise from an old species, a new genus from another genus, etc.

— Yuri Filipchenko, Variabilität und Variation (1927), page 89

However, Filipchenko's views are not consistent with contemporary understanding of evolution. Furthermore, the Linnaean ranks of 'genus' (and higher) are not real entities but arbitrary concepts. These traditional taxonomic concepts break down when they are applied to common ancestry.

Nevertheless, Filipchenko’s distinction between microevolution and macroevolution had a major influence on evolutionary biology. The term macroevolution was adopted by Filipchenko's protégé Theodosius Dobzhansky in his book 'Genetics und the Origin of Species' (1937), a seminal piece that contributed to the development of the Modern Synthesis. The term was also used by critics of the Modern Synthesis. A good example of this is the book The Material Basis of Evolution (1940) by the geneticist Richard Goldschmidt, a close friend of Filipchenko. Goldschmidt suggested saltational evolutionary changes which found a moderate revival in the 'hopeful monster' concept of evolutionary developmental biology (or evo-devo). Occasionally such dramatic changes can lead to novel features that survive.

As an alternative to saltational evolution, Dobzhansky suggested that the difference between macroevolution and microevolution reflects essentially a difference in time-scales, and that macroevolutionary changes were simply the sum of microevolutionary changes over geologic time. This view became broadly accepted in the middle of the last century but it has been challenged by a number of scientists who claim that microevolution is necessary but not sufficient to explain macroevolution. This is the decoupled view (see below).

== Microevolution vs Macroevolution ==
Micro- and macroevolution are both supported by overwhelming evidence. This fact remains uncontroversial within the scientific community. However, there has been considerable debate regarding the connection between microevolution and macroevolution.

Broadly speaking, there are two views regarding this issue. The 'Extrapolation' view holds that macroevolution is merely cumulative microevolution. The 'Decoupled' view holds that there are separate macroevolutionary processes that cannot be sufficiently explained by microevolutionary processes alone. Most scientists who adopt the second viewpoint are not claiming that macroevolution is incompatible with microevolution. Rather, they see macroevolution as an autonomous field of study regarding the deep history of life. For this reason, a full understanding of macroevolution requires insights that are not limited to microevolution. An example of this argument has been made by Francisco J. Ayala.

"...macroevolutionary processes are underlain by microevolutionary phenomena and are compatible with microevolutionary theories, but macroevolutionary studies require the formulation of autonomous hypotheses and models (which must be tested using macroevolutionary evidence). In this (epistemologically) very important sense, macroevolution is decoupled from microevolution: macroevolution is an autonomous field of evolutionary study."

— Francisco J. Ayala (1983)

Microevolution is characterized by the evolutionary process of changing heritable characteristics (phenotypes) and changes in allele frequencies (genotypes) within populations. This involves mechanisms such as mutation, natural selection, and genetic drift as studied in the field of population genetics. In contrast, macroevolution concerns how species and higher taxonomic groups (genera, families, orders, etc) have evolved across geography and vast spans of geological time. For example, whether speciation is sympatric or allopatric; and whether the common mode of macroevolution is better described in terms of phyletic gradualism or punctuated equilibrium. These and other important questions and topics are researched within various scientific fields, which makes the study of macroevolution highly interdisciplinary. Examples of these include:

- How different species are related to each other is researched in phylogenetics).
- The rates of evolutionary change and across time in the fossil record. For example, some groups appear to experience a lot of change while others remain morphologically stable, which are often referred to as living fossils. However, that term has been criticized for wrongfully implying that such organisms have not evolved at all.
- Why different taxonomic groups (even those with similar ages) exhibit different survival/extinction rates, species diversity, and/or morphological disparity.
- The causes and impacts of Mass extinctions and evolutionary diversifications, e.g. the Permian-Triassic and Cretaceous-Paleogene events, the Cambrian Explosion and Cretaceous Terrestrial Revolution.
- Does natural selection also operate at the species level (see Group Selection)?
- Long-term trends in evolution, e.g. trends towards complexity or simplicity and whether these trends are directional or passive.
- How distinctive and complex traits have evolved, e.g. gene duplication, heterochrony, novelty in evo-devo, facilitated variation, and constructive neutral evolution.

== Macroevolutionary processes ==
=== Speciation ===
According to Hautmann, speciation has both micro- and macroevolutionary aspects. Specifically, speciation also involves the classic process of descent with modification, i.e. morphological transformation observed across many generations. This is microevolutionary. In contrast, the species variation produced by speciation, and the rate at which it successfully occurs, is macroevolutionary. Stephen J. Gould also saw species as the basic unit of macroevolution.

Speciation is the process in which populations within one species change to an extent at which they become reproductively isolated, that is, they cannot interbreed anymore. However, this classical concept has been challenged and more recently, a phylogenetic or evolutionary species concept has been adopted. Their main criteria for new species is to be diagnosable and monophyletic, that is, they form a clearly defined lineage.

Charles Darwin first discovered that speciation can be extrapolated so that species not only evolve into new species, but also into new genera, families and other groups of animals. In other words, macroevolution is reducible to microevolution through selection of traits over long periods of time. In addition, some scholars have argued that selection at the species level is important as well. The advent of genome sequencing enabled the discovery of gradual genetic changes both during speciation but also across higher taxa. For instance, the evolution of humans from ancestral primates or other mammals can be traced to numerous but individual mutations.

According to the Resource-use hypothesis, the diversification of terrestrial species is closely related to global climatic changes, particularly the Cenozoic alternation of warming and cooling episodes. Global analysis of terrestrial mammals supports the view that these physical environmental changes have shaped macroevolutionary patterns by promoting biome specialisation. This specialization leads to significantly higher rates of vicariance and speciation in biome specialist (stenobiomic) lineages compared to generalist lineages.

=== Evolution of new organs and tissues ===
One of the main questions in evolutionary biology is how new structures evolve, such as new organs. Macroevolution is often thought to require the evolution of structures that are 'completely new'. However, fundamentally novel structures are not necessary for dramatic evolutionary change. As can be seen in vertebrate evolution, most "new" organs are actually not new—they are simply modifications of previously existing organs. For instance, the evolution of mammal diversity in the past 100 million years has not required any major innovation. All of this diversity can be explained by modification of existing organs, such as the evolution of elephant tusks from incisors. Other examples include wings (modified limbs), feathers (modified reptile scales), lungs (modified swim bladders, e.g. found in fish), or even the heart (a muscularized segment of a vein).

The same concept applies to the evolution of "novel" tissues. Even fundamental tissues such as bone can evolve from combining existing proteins (collagen) with calcium phosphate (specifically, hydroxy-apatite). This probably happened when certain cells that make collagen also accumulated calcium phosphate to get a proto-bone cell.

== Examples ==
=== Evolutionary faunas ===
A macroevolutionary benchmark study is Sepkoski's work on marine animal diversity through the Phanerozoic. His iconic diagram of the numbers of marine families from the Cambrian to the Recent illustrates the successive expansion and dwindling of three "evolutionary faunas" that were characterized by differences in origination rates and carrying capacities. Long-term ecological changes and major geological events are postulated to have played crucial roles in shaping these evolutionary faunas.

=== Stanley's rule ===
Macroevolution is driven by differences between species in origination and extinction rates. Remarkably, these two factors are generally positively correlated: taxa that have typically high diversification rates also have high extinction rates. This observation has been described first by Steven Stanley, who attributed it to a variety of ecological factors. Yet, a positive correlation of origination and extinction rates is also a prediction of the Red Queen hypothesis, which postulates that evolutionary progress (increase in fitness) of any given species causes a decrease in fitness of other species, ultimately driving to extinction those species that do not adapt rapidly enough. High rates of origination must therefore correlate with high rates of extinction. Stanley's rule, which applies to almost all taxa and geologic ages, is therefore an indication for a dominant role of biotic interactions in macroevolution.

=== Evolution of multicellularity ===
The evolution of multicellular organisms is one of the major breakthroughs in evolution. The first step of converting a unicellular organism into a metazoan (a multicellular organism) is to allow cells to attach to each other. This can be achieved by one or a few mutations. In fact, many bacteria form multicellular assemblies, e.g. cyanobacteria or myxobacteria. Another species of bacteria, Jeongeupia sacculi, form well-ordered sheets of cells, which ultimately develop into a bulbous structure. Similarly, unicellular yeast cells can become multicellular by a single mutation in the ACE2 gene, which causes the cells to form a branched multicellular form.

=== Evolution of bat wings ===
The wings of bats have the same structural elements (bones) as any other five-fingered mammal (see periodicity in limb development). However, the finger bones in bats are dramatically elongated, so the question is how these bones became so long. It has been shown that certain growth factors such as bone morphogenetic proteins (specifically Bmp2) is over expressed so that it stimulates an elongation of certain bones. Genetic changes in the bat genome identified the changes that lead to this phenotype and it has been recapitulated in mice: when specific bat DNA is inserted in the mouse genome, recapitulating these mutations, the bones of mice grow longer.

=== Limb loss in lizards and snakes ===
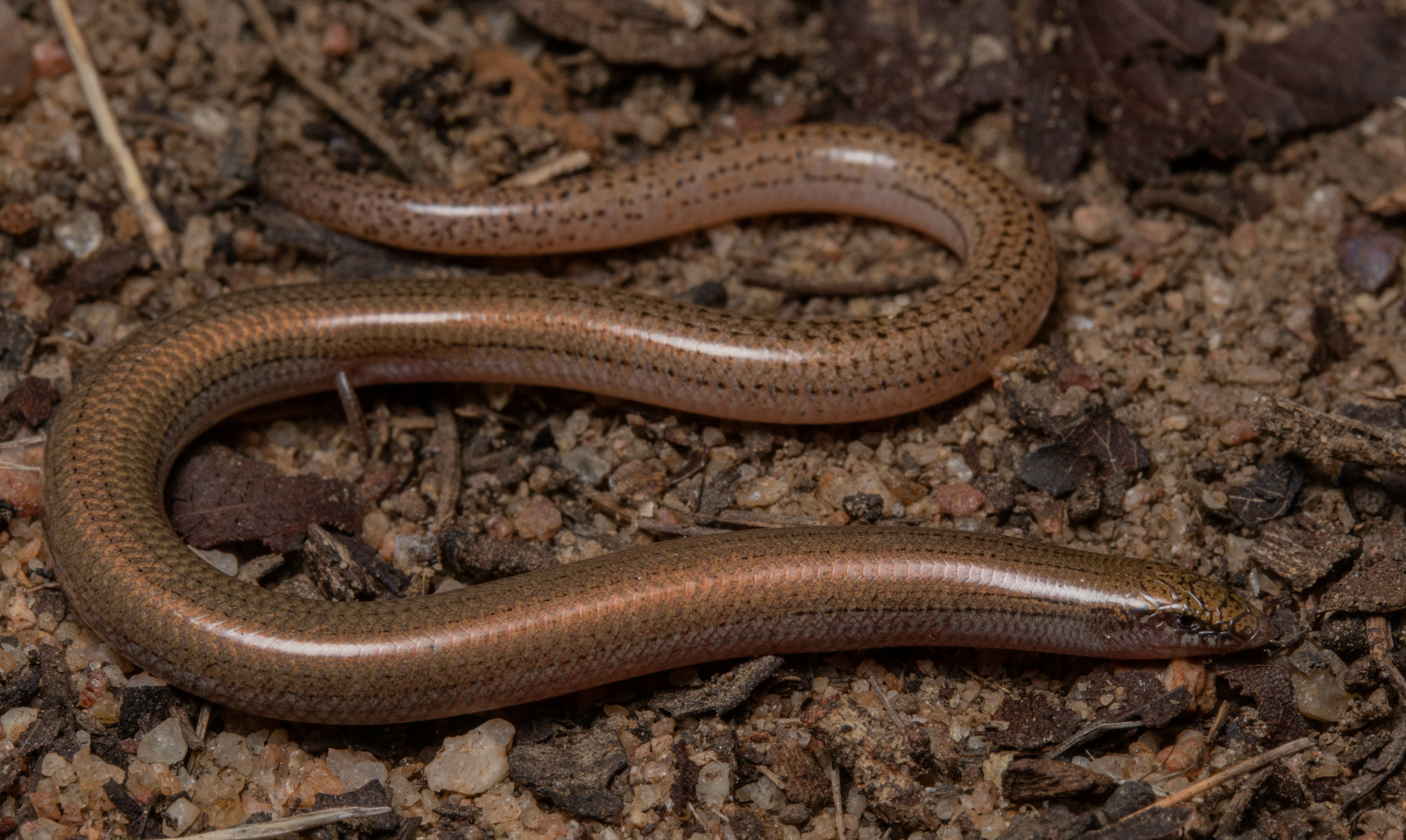
Limbloss in lizards can be observed in the genus Lerista which shows many intermediary steps with increasing loss of digits and toes. The species shown here, Lerista cinerea, has no digits and only 1 toe left.

Snakes evolved from lizards. Phylogenetic analysis shows that snakes are actually nested within the phylogenetic tree of lizards, demonstrating that they have a common ancestor. This split happened about 180 million years ago and several intermediary fossils are known to document the origin. In fact, limbs have been lost in numerous clades of reptiles, and there are cases of recent limb loss. For instance, the skink genus Lerista has lost limbs in multiple cases, with all possible intermediary steps, that is, there are species which have fully developed limbs, shorter limbs with 5, 4, 3, 2, 1 or no toes at all.

=== Human evolution ===
While human evolution from their primate ancestors did not require massive morphological changes, our brain has sufficiently changed to allow human consciousness and intelligence. While the latter involves relatively minor morphological changes it did result in dramatic changes to brain function. Thus, macroevolution does not have to be morphological, it can also be functional.

The study of human (brain) evolution benefits from the fact that human and ape genomes are available so that the genomes of our common ancestor can be reconstructed. Even though the precise genetic mechanisms that shaped the human brain are not known, the mutations involved in human brain evolution are largely known, given that the genes expressed in the brain are relatively well understood.

=== Evolution of viviparity in lizards ===
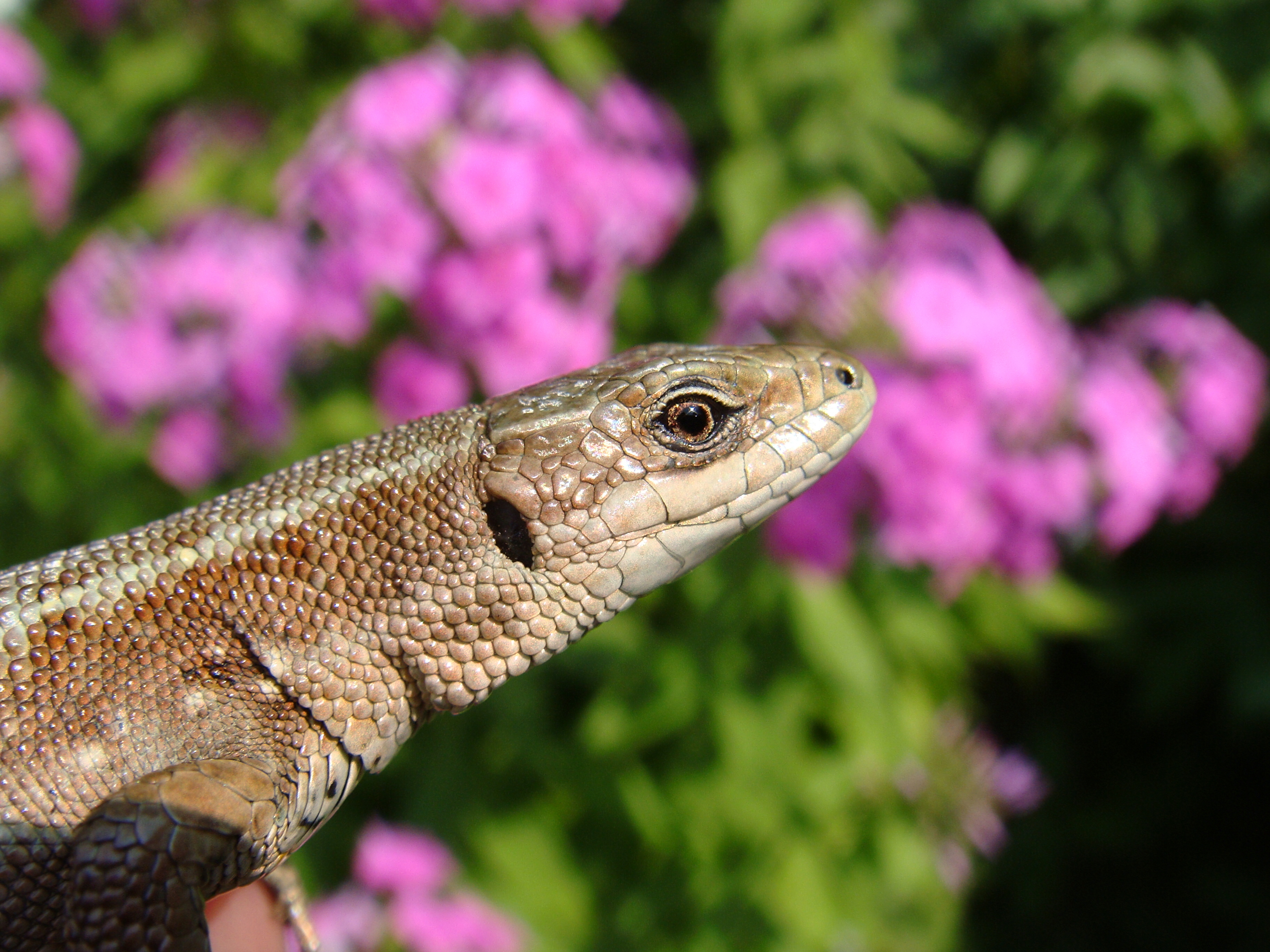
The European Common Lizard (Zootoca vivipara) consists of populations that are egg-laying or live-bearing, demonstrating that this dramatic difference can even evolve within a species.

Most lizards are egg-laying and thus need an environment that is warm enough to incubate their eggs. However, some species have evolved viviparity, that is, they give birth to live young, as almost all mammals do. In several clades of lizards, egg-laying (oviparous) species have evolved into live-bearing ones, apparently with very little genetic change. For instance, a European common lizard, Zootoca vivipara, is viviparous throughout most of its range, but oviparous in the extreme southwest portion. That is, within a single species, a radical change in reproductive behavior has happened. Similar cases are known from South American lizards of the genus Liolaemus which have egg-laying species at lower altitudes, but closely related viviparous species at higher altitudes, suggesting that the switch from oviparous to viviparous reproduction does not require many genetic changes.

== Research topics ==
Subjects studied within macroevolution include:

- Adaptive radiations such as the Cambrian Explosion.
- Changes in biodiversity through time.
- Evo-devo (the connection between evolution and developmental biology)
- Genome evolution, like horizontal gene transfer, genome fusions in endosymbioses, and adaptive changes in genome size.
- Mass extinctions.
- Estimating diversification rates, including rates of speciation and extinction.
- The debate between punctuated equilibrium and gradualism.
- The role of development in shaping evolution, particularly such topics as heterochrony and phenotypic plasticity.

== See also ==
- Extinction event
- Interspecific competition
- Microevolution
- Molecular evolution
- Punctuated equilibrium
- Red Queen hypothesis
- Speciation
- Transitional fossil
- Unit of selection
