= Theodosius Dobzhansky =

Russian-American geneticist and evolutionary biologist (1900–1975)

Theodosius Dobzhansky ForMemRS
- Dobzhansky in 1966
- Born: Theodosius Grigorievich Dobzhansky; January 25, 1900; Nemirov, Russian Empire (now Nemyriv, Ukraine)
- Died: December 18, 1975 (aged 75); Davis, California, US
- Education: University of Kiev
- Known for: Bateson–Dobzhansky–Muller model
- Spouse: Natalia Sivertzeva (m. 1924)
- Children: Sophie Coe
- Parents: Grigory Dobzhansky (father); Sophia Voinarsky (mother)
- Awards: Daniel Giraud Elliot Medal (1941); Guggenheim Fellowship (1959); National Medal of Science (1964); Franklin Medal (1973)
- Scientific career
- Fields: Evolutionary biology, genetics
- Workplaces: University of Kiev (1921–1924); University of Leningrad (1924–1927); Columbia University (1927–1928, 1940–1962); California Institute of Technology (1928–1940); Rockefeller University (1962–1970); University of California, Davis (1971–1975)
- Doctoral advisor: Yuri Filipchenko
- Doctoral students: Bruce Wallace, Richard Lewontin

Theodosius Grigorievich Dobzhansky (Russian: Феодосий Григорьевич Добржанский; Ukrainian: Теодосій Григорович Добржанський; January 25, 1900 – December 18, 1975) was a Russian-born American geneticist and evolutionary biologist. He was a central figure in the field of evolutionary biology for his work in shaping the modern synthesis and also popular for his support and promotion of theistic evolution as a practicing Christian. Born in the Russian Empire, Dobzhansky emigrated to the United States in 1927 at the age of 27.

His 1937 work Genetics and the Origin of Species became a major influence on the modern synthesis. He was awarded the U.S. National Medal of Science in 1964 and the Franklin Medal in 1973. He is famous for his essay "Nothing in Biology Makes Sense Except in the Light of Evolution."

== Biography ==
=== Early life ===
Dobzhansky was born on January 25, 1900, in Nemirov, Russian Empire (now Nemyriv, Ukraine), the only child of Grigory Dobzhansky, a mathematics teacher, and Sophia Voinarsky. He was given an unusual name, Theodosius, because he was born after his middle-aged parents prayed for a child to St. Theodosius of Chernigov. In 1910 the family moved to Kiev.

At high school, Dobzhansky collected butterflies and decided to become a biologist. In 1915, he met Victor Luchnik who convinced him to specialize in beetles instead. Dobzhansky attended the University of Kiev, where he then studied until 1924 specializing in entomology. He then moved to Leningrad (today St. Petersburg) to study under Yuri Filipchenko, where a Drosophila melanogaster laboratory had been established.

On August 8, 1924, Dobzhansky married geneticist Natalia "Natasha" Sivertzeva, who was working with Ivan Schmalhausen in Kiev. The Dobzhanskys had one daughter, known under her married name as Sophie Coe, an anthropologist, food historian, and author, primarily known for her work on the history of chocolate.

Before immigrating to the United States, Dobzhansky published 35 scientific works on entomology and genetics.

=== America ===
Dobzhansky immigrated to the United States in 1927 on a work–study scholarship from the International Education Board of the Rockefeller Foundation. Upon arriving in New York City on December 27, he joined the Drosophila Group at Columbia University working alongside Thomas Hunt Morgan and Alfred Sturtevant. Their work provided crucial information on Drosophila cytogenetics. Additionally, Dobzhansky and his team helped establish Drosophila pseudoobscura, within the genus Drosophila, as a favorable model organism in evolutionary-biological studies ever since they published their influential works. Dobzhansky's original mindset (after studying alongside Yuri Filipchenko), was that there were serious doubts on using data obtained from phenomena happening in local populations (microevolution) and phenomena happening on a global scale (macroevolution). Filipchenko also believed that there were only two types of inheritance: Mendelian inheritance of variation within species, and Non-Mendelian inheritance of variation in a macroevolutionary sense. Dobzhansky later stated that Filipchenko "bet on the wrong horse".

He followed Morgan to the California Institute of Technology from 1930 to 1940. On the basis of his experiments, he articulated the idea that reproductive isolation can be caused by differences in presence of microbial symbionts between populations. In 1937, he published one of the major works of the modern evolutionary synthesis, the synthesis of evolutionary biology with genetics, titled Genetics and the Origin of Species, which amongst other things, defined evolution as "a change in the frequency of an allele within a gene pool". Dobzhansky's work was instrumental in spreading the idea that it is through mutations in genes that natural selection takes place. Also in 1937, he became a naturalized citizen of the United States. During this time, he had a very public falling out with one of his Drosophila collaborators, Alfred Sturtevant, based primarily in professional competition.

He returned to Columbia University from 1940 to 1962. Among his students was geneticist Bruce Wallace. In 1941, Dobzhansky was awarded the Daniel Giraud Elliot Medal from the National Academy of Sciences, of which he was also a member. He was elected to the American Philosophical Society in 1942. In 1943, the University of São Paulo awarded him an honorary doctorate. He was one of the signatories of the 1950 UNESCO statement The Race Question. He was elected to the American Academy of Arts and Sciences in 1953. He then moved to the Rockefeller Institute (shortly to become Rockefeller University) until his retirement in 1971. In 1972 he was elected the founding president of the Behavior Genetics Association, and was recognized by the society for his role in behavior genetics, and the founding of the society by the creation of the Dobzhansky Award (for a lifetime of outstanding scholarship in behavior genetics).

Dobzhansky's work in the field of evolutionary genetics, with the help of Sewall Wright, integrated standards of the theoretical, natural historical, and experimental work.

Dobzhansky was elected a Foreign Member of the Royal Society (ForMemRS) in 1965. In 1970, he published Genetics of the evolutionary process.

Dobzhansky was renowned as the president of the Genetics Society of America in 1941, president of the American Society of Naturalists in 1950, president of the Society for the Study of Evolution in 1951, president of the American Society of Zoologists in 1963, a member of the board of directors of the American Eugenics Society in 1964, and president of the American Teilhard de Chardin Association in 1969.

Dobzhansky's research and studies allowed him to travel the world and receive honorary degrees in Australia, Belgium, Brazil, Canada, Denmark, England, Germany, Italy, Japan, and Sweden.

=== Genetics and the Origin of Species ===
Theodosius Dobzhansky published three editions of his book Genetics and the Origin of Species. Although the book was meant for people with a background in biology, it was easily understood. In the fields of genetics and evolution, Dobzhansky's book is acknowledged as one of the most important books ever written. With each revision of Genetics and the Origin of Species, Dobzhansky added new material on crucial, up-to-date topics, and removed material he deemed to be no longer crucial. His book sparked trends in genetic research and theory.

The first edition of Genetics and the Origin of Species (1937) highlighted the most recent discoveries in genetics and how they applied to the concept of evolution. The book starts by addressing the problem of evolution and how modern discoveries in genetics could help find a solution. The book covers the chromosomal basis of Mendelian Inheritance, how the effects from changes in chromosomes greater than gene mutations are common and acceptable, and how mutations form racial and specific differences. Dobzhansky explained how three levels could describe the processes of evolutionary population genetics: (1) the origin of raw materials by mutations of genes and chromosomes, (2) the changes in populations by changes in frequencies and combinations of mutations, (3) the fixation of changes by reproductive isolation. To support his writing and research, the bibliography was twenty-eight pages long with around six hundred sources.

In Dobzhansky's second edition of Genetics and the Origin of Species (1941), four years had gone by and he was able to add more research and advancements made in genetics. Around half of the new research he found was added to the last two chapters in his book: Patterns of Evolution, and Species as Natural Units. In the second to last chapter, Patterns of Evolution, Dobzhansky explained how on the path to a new adaptation, a method could be used to where a species could go through a less adaptive stage. The last chapter, Species as Natural Units, Dobzhansky explained some of the contributions made in genetics to what was called "the new systematics". Dobzhansky's second edition of the book also had twice as many sources in the bibliography than the first edition.

In the third revision of Genetics and the Origin of Species (1951), Dobzhansky rewrote all ten chapters on: Isolating Mechanisms, Mutation in Populations, Organic Diversity, Heredity and Mutation, Race Formation, Selection, Adaptive Polymorphism, Hybrid Sterility, Species as Natural Units, and Patterns of Evolution. Dobzhansky decided to remove the chapter on Polyploidy in the third edition. The new chapter on Adaptive Polymorphism highlighted Dobzhansky's research since the second edition. He included precise, quantitative evidence on effective natural selection in laboratory and free populations.

=== Campaign against Lysenkoism ===
Dobzhansky, who knew personally many Soviet biologists that were victims of Trofim Lysenko's campaign against genetics and Darwinism, was an outspoken opponent of Lysenkoism. Dobzhansky in the 1940s personally translated Lysenko's work into English in order to demonstrate its flaws to those in the English-speaking world.

=== Debate about race ===
Theodosius Dobzhansky and Ashley Montagu debated the use and validity of the term "race" over a period of many years without reaching an agreement. Montagu argued that "race" was so laden with toxic associations that it was a word best eliminated from science completely. Dobzhansky argued that science should not give in to the misuses to which it had been subjected, and that the concept of animal and plant races has been important in biology; the modern synthesis used the concept for describing the diverging biological populations differing in gene frequencies. This was done in hopes that its foundation in population genetics would undermine the deeply ingrained social prejudices associated with "race".

His concern with the interface between humans and biology may have come from different factors. The main factor would be the race prejudice that contributed in Europe that triggered WWII. His concern also dealt with religion in human life which he speaks about in his book The Biology of Ultimate Concern in 1967. "The pervasiveness of genetic variation provides the biological foundation of human individuality". Dobzhansky talks about in great detail that "human nature has 2 dimensions: the biological, which mankind shares with the rest of life, and the cultural, which is exclusive to humans." Both of these are believed to have come from "biological evolution and cultural evolution".

Dobzhansky sought to put an end to the pseudoscience that purports genetic makeup to determine race, and thus rank in society. Harrison E. Salisbury wrote in a New York Times review of Dobzhansky's book Heredity and the Future of Man that Dobzhansky could not, together with other scientists, agree upon what defines a race. Dobzhansky stated that a true bloodline for man could not be identified. He did not believe that a person's genetic makeup decided whether or not he would be a great man but rather that man "has the rare opportunity 'to direct his evolution'".

=== Final illness and the "Light of Evolution" ===
Dobzhansky's wife Natasha died of coronary thrombosis on February 22, 1969. Earlier (on June 1, 1968), Theodosius had been diagnosed with lymphocytic leukemia (a chronic form of leukemia), and had been given a few months to a few years to live. He retired in 1971, moving to the University of California, Davis where his student Francisco J. Ayala had been made assistant professor, and where he continued working as an emeritus professor. He published one of his most famous essays "Nothing in Biology Makes Sense Except in the Light of Evolution" in 1973, influenced by the paleontologist and priest Pierre Teilhard de Chardin.

By 1975, his leukemia had become more severe, and on November 11 he traveled to San Jacinto, California, for treatment and care. Working until his last day as a professor of genetics, Dobzhansky died (from heart failure) on December 18, 1975, in Davis, California. He was cremated, and his ashes were scattered in the Californian wilderness.

=== Evolution and God ===
Theodosius Dobzhansky believed that God and science can be reconciled through the idea that the Creator brought about his plan through the processes of evolution. He described his beliefs as "Evolution is God's, or Nature's, method of Creation."

== Publications ==
During his career, Dobzhansky published widely in books and peer-reviewed scientific journals:

=== Books ===
- Sinnott, E.W., Dunn, L.C and Dobzhansky, Th. 1925. Principles of Genetics. McGraw-Hill. (5 editions: 1925, 1932, 1939, 1950, 1958; Dobzhansky co-editor only on 1950 & 1958 editions).
- Dobzhansky, Th. 1937. Genetics and the Origin of Species. Columbia University Press, New York. (2nd ed., 1941; 3rd ed., 1951)
- The Biological Basis of Human Freedom (1954).
- Dunn, L. C., & Dobzhansky, Th. 1946. Heredity, Race, and Society. The New American Library of World Literature, Inc., New York.
- Dobzhansky, Th. 1955. Evolution, Genetics, & Man. Wiley & Sons, New York.
- Dobzhansky, Th. (1962). Mankind Evolving: The Evolution of Human Species. New Haven, Connecticut: Yale University Press – via Internet Archive.
- Dobzhansky, Th. 1966. Heredity and the Nature of Man. Harcourt, Brace & World Inc., New York, New York.
- Dobzhansky, Th. 1967. The Biology of Ultimate Concern. New American Library, New York.
- Dobzhansky, Th. 1970. Genetics of the Evolutionary Process. Columbia University Press, New York.
- Dobzhansky, Th. 1973. Genetic Diversity and Human Equality. Basic Books, New York.
- Dobzhansky, Th., F.J. Ayala, G.L. Stebbins & J.W. Valentine. 1977. Evolution. W.H. Freeman, San Francisco.
- Dobzhansky, Th. 1981. Dobzhansky's Genetics of Natural Populations I-XLIII. R.C. Lewontin, J.A. Moore, W.B. Provine & B. Wallace, eds. Columbia University Press, New York. (reprints the 43 papers in this series, all but two of which were authored or co-authored by Dobzhansky)
- Dobzhansky, Theodosius; Boesiger, Ernest (1983). Human Culture, A Moment in Evolution. New York: Columbia University Press. ISBN 978-0-231-05632-8 – via Internet Archive.

=== Papers ===
- Dobzhansky, Th. (1973). "Nothing in Biology Makes Sense Except in the Light of Evolution" (PDF). The American Biology Teacher. 35 (3): 125–129. doi:10.2307/4444260. JSTOR 4444260. S2CID 207358177.
- Dobzhansky, Th.; Pavlovsky, O. (1957). "An experimental study of interaction between genetic drift and natural selection". Evolution. 11 (3): 311–319. doi:10.2307/2405795. JSTOR 2405795.

=== Recensions ===
- Dobzhansky, Th. Wrote a recension of "The origin of races" by the anthropologist Carleton S. Coon. Dobzhansky rejected Coon's theory of independent origin of identical mutations, but he did agree that selection favored a sapiens-like genotype in all proto-human populations, and expressed the theory that all sapiens-alleles existed at a low frequency in all erectus-populations, and that the statistical composition of the gene pool shifted from erectus to sapiens in multiple populations independently.

Awards
Preceded by George B. Kistiakowsky	Recipient of the Elliott Cresson Medal; 1973	Succeeded by Nikolai Nikolaevich Bogoliubov
